= List of United States counties by per capita income =

This is a list of United States counties by per capita income. Data for the 50 states and the District of Columbia is from the 2009–2013 American Community Survey 5-Year Estimates; data for Puerto Rico is from the 2013–2017 American Community Survey 5-Year estimates, and data for the other U.S. territories is from the 2010 U.S. census. State income levels and income data for the United States as a whole are included for comparison. County-equivalents in Louisiana are called "parishes", and in Alaska are called "boroughs"; census areas in the Unorganized Borough are also county-equivalents in Alaska. For states where independent cities are county-equivalents, the word "city" is included to identify the independent cities and to differentiate them from counties with identical names; the counties with the identical names have the word "county" following them. The word "county" is included in the names of counties that have names identical to the names of U.S. states or cities to differentiate them.

The 89 permanently-inhabited county-equivalents in the territories of the United States (such as the municipalities of Puerto Rico) are also listed (they are not ranked). Overall, per capita income in the U.S. territories tends to be lower than per capita income in the 50 states and District of Columbia.

The list below excludes the 8 county-equivalents in the U.S. territories that have zero people (Baker Island, Howland Island, Jarvis Island, Johnston Atoll, Kingman Reef, Navassa Island, Northern Islands Municipality and Rose Atoll)—all of these county-equivalents have a per capita income of $0 because no one lives in them. The 3 semi-populated county-equivalents in the U.S. Minor Outlying Islands (Midway Atoll, Palmyra Atoll and Wake Island) are also excluded (total excluded: 11).

Excluding the uninhabited county-equivalents, the county or county-equivalent with the highest per capita income is New York County, New York (Manhattan) ($76,592), and the county or county-equivalent with the lowest per capita income is Manu'a District, American Samoa ($5,441).

== Lists ==
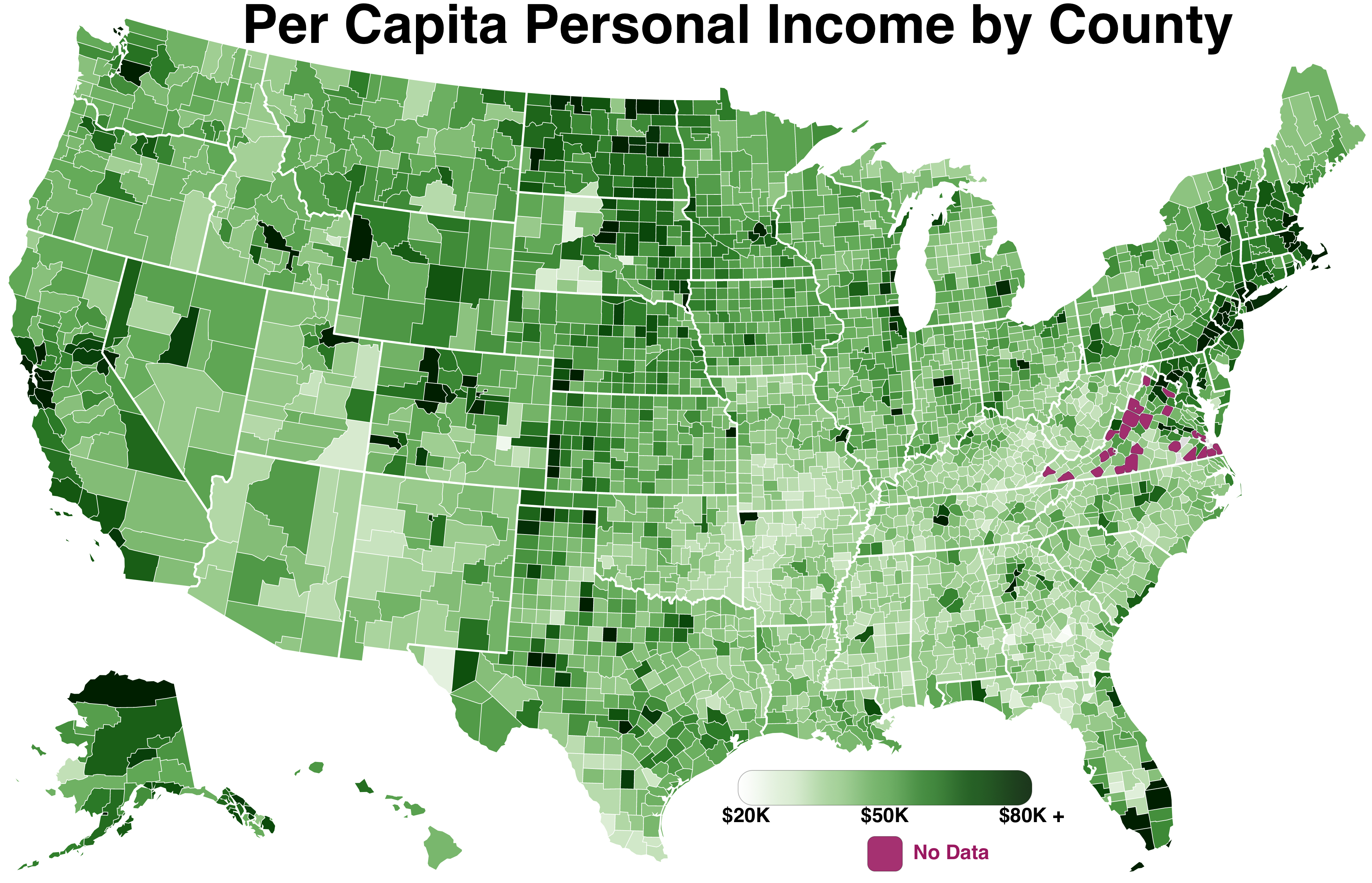
Per capita personal income by County ~$20,000 $30,000 $40,000 $50,000 $60,000 $70,000 $80,000+

Note: This is a very large table and there will be noticeable pauses when sorting.

Rank	County or county-equivalent	State, federal district or territory	Per capita income	Median household income	Median family income	Population	Number of households
1	New York County	New York	$76,592	$69,659	$86,553	1,628,706	759,460
2	Arlington	Virginia	$62,018	$103,208	$139,244	214,861	94,454
3	Falls Church City	Virginia	$59,088	$120,000	$152,857	12,731	5,020
4	Marin	California	$56,791	$90,839	$117,357	254,643	102,912
5	Santa Clara	California	$56,248	$124,055	$124,055	1,927,852	640,215
6	Alexandria City	Virginia	$54,608	$85,706	$107,511	143,684	65,369
7	Pitkin	Colorado	$51,814	$72,745	$93,981	17,173	7,507
8	Los Alamos	New Mexico	$51,044	$106,686	$124,979	17,979	7,590
9	Fairfax County	Virginia	$50,532	$110,292	$128,596	1,101,071	389,908
10	Hunterdon	New Jersey	$50,349	$106,143	$125,828	127,047	46,816
11	Borden	Texas	$50,042	$71,607	$76,250	649	225
12	Montgomery	Maryland	$49,038	$98,221	$117,408	989,474	360,563
13	Morris	New Jersey	$48,814	$98,633	$117,683	495,261	179,665
14	Fairfield	Connecticut	$48,721	$82,283	$104,250	926,233	332,655
15	San Francisco	California	$48,486	$75,604	$90,116	817,501	345,344
16	Howard	Maryland	$48,172	$109,865	$128,657	293,821	106,142
17	Westchester	New York	$47,984	$81,946	$105,341	956,283	343,561
18	Somerset	New Jersey	$47,803	$99,020	$117,393	326,207	115,531
19	Nantucket	Massachusetts	$47,331	$85,478	$92,500	10,224	4,069
20	Loudoun	Virginia	$46,565	$122,238	$133,550	326,477	106,997
21	North Slope	Alaska	$46,457	$80,761	$82,500	9,484	1,990
22	San Mateo	California	$45,732	$88,202	$105,844	729,543	257,941
23	Kalawao	Hawaii	$45,515	$59,375	$88,750	71	46
24	Washington, DC		$45,290	$65,830	$79,665	619,371	263,649
25	Goochland	Virginia	$45,039	$80,976	$92,042	21,565	8,058
26	Norfolk	Massachusetts	$44,692	$84,916	$108,943	677,296	257,451
27	Fairfax City	Virginia	$44,345	$97,242	$113,538	23,027	8,492
28	Douglas	Colorado	$43,634	$101,591	$112,930	293,014	103,780
29	Teton	Wyoming	$43,444	$68,078	$83,558	21,575	7,583
30	Bergen	New Jersey	$43,347	$83,794	$102,222	912,795	335,422
31	Middlesex	Massachusetts	$42,861	$82,090	$104,032	1,522,533	581,120
32	Monmouth	New Jersey	$42,749	$84,526	$105,971	629,735	233,909
33	Summit	Utah	$42,462	$83,336	$95,879	37,232	13,627
34	Nassau	New York	$42,400	$97,690	$112,874	1,343,765	441,955
35	Mineral	Colorado	$42,255	$47,083	$68,438	761	393
36	Chester	Pennsylvania	$42,210	$86,050	$105,278	503,075	184,788
37	Ozaukee	Wisconsin	$42,041	$75,457	$92,262	86,708	34,108
38	Clear Creek	Colorado	$41,716	$67,259	$89,583	9,048	4,024
39	Montgomery	Pennsylvania	$41,472	$79,183	$99,587	804,621	307,488
40	Williamson	Tennessee	$41,292	$89,779	$104,796	188,935	66,364
41	San Miguel	Colorado	$40,827	$63,594	$77,708	7,496	3,234
42	Anne Arundel	Maryland	$40,415	$87,430	$101,268	544,426	199,904
43	Putnam	New York	$40,309	$95,117	$109,188	99,718	34,496
44	Newport	Rhode Island	$40,293	$71,713	$88,962	82,545	34,774
45	Delaware County	Ohio	$40,189	$89,757	$103,564	178,139	64,208
46	Middlesex	Connecticut	$39,992	$76,994	$98,501	165,690	66,141
47	King	Washington	$39,911	$71,811	$92,510	1,974,567	802,606
48	Fauquier	Virginia	$39,600	$88,409	$103,556	66,015	23,130
49	Hamilton	Indiana	$39,521	$82,468	$99,768	282,977	103,234
50	Eagle	Colorado	$39,497	$74,456	$86,167	52,151	17,966
51	James City County	Virginia	$39,133	$76,960	$90,406	68,171	26,883
52	Bristol	Rhode Island	$38,893	$71,238	$93,131	49,426	19,174
53	Johnson	Kansas	$38,827	$74,717	$92,512	552,947	216,304
54	Clarke	Virginia	$38,748	$77,597	$95,654	14,191	5,580
55	Williams	North Dakota	$38,738	$76,210	$86,285	25,024	10,411
56	DuPage	Illinois	$38,570	$78,487	$95,208	922,803	336,028
57	Poquoson City	Virginia	$38,444	$81,892	$98,848	12,117	4,591
58	Rockingham	New Hampshire	$38,399	$77,348	$93,420	296,718	116,262
59	Calvert	Maryland	$38,260	$95,477	$107,684	89,332	30,923
60	Contra Costa	California	$38,219	$78,756	$94,208	1,065,794	375,855
61	Queen Anne's	Maryland	$38,108	$87,256	$97,909	48,166	17,292
62	Gilpin	Colorado	$38,022	$63,885	$87,639	5,477	2,504
63	Talbot	Maryland	$38,022	$61,597	$74,811	37,859	16,013
64	Lake	Illinois	$38,018	$77,469	$92,116	702,099	241,072
65	Boulder	Colorado	$38,011	$67,956	$92,667	301,072	120,521
66	Billings	North Dakota	$37,972	$57,083	$69,167	876	350
67	Sussex	New Jersey	$37,949	$87,335	$100,066	147,924	54,746
Connecticut			$37,892	$69,461	$87,245	3,583,561	1,355,849
68	Collin	Texas	$37,839	$82,762	$97,421	811,308	289,752
69	San Juan	Washington	$37,719	$53,376	$65,067	15,786	7,753
70	Litchfield	Connecticut	$37,667	$71,338	$87,945	188,629	75,755
71	Waukesha	Wisconsin	$37,577	$75,850	$92,974	391,200	153,422
72	Juneau	Alaska	$37,558	$81,490	$95,112	31,897	12,099
73	Hennepin	Minnesota	$37,485	$64,403	$84,559	1,170,623	481,263
74	Boone	Indiana	$37,482	$67,255	$80,907	58,009	21,908
75	Bucks	Pennsylvania	$37,466	$76,555	$92,907	625,977	230,366
76	Mercer	New Jersey	$37,465	$73,480	$94,267	368,094	130,754
77	Carver	Minnesota	$37,457	$83,773	$96,913	92,770	33,486
78	Broomfield	Colorado	$37,442	$77,998	$96,787	57,171	22,016
79	Prince William	Virginia	$37,401	$98,071	$106,544	416,668	132,442
80	Charles	Maryland	$37,277	$93,160	$104,078	148,957	51,247
81	Albemarle	Virginia	$37,239	$67,725	$89,889	100,636	37,964
82	Skagway	Alaska	$37,139	$71,667	$77,500	1,080	412
83	Bristol Bay	Alaska	$37,024	$79,531	$96,458	933	384
84	Washington County	Rhode Island	$37,023	$72,138	$91,532	126,627	49,430
85	Suffolk	New York	$36,945	$87,763	$100,652	1,495,803	497,347
86	Frederick	Maryland	$36,917	$84,570	$98,259	236,668	86,337
87	St. Johns	Florida	$36,836	$64,876	$80,707	197,115	75,558
88	Burlington	New Jersey	$36,835	$78,446	$94,324	449,964	164,979
89	Fulton	Georgia	$36,757	$56,857	$75,658	948,554	368,184
90	Washington County	Minnesota	$36,706	$81,540	$94,263	241,315	88,947
91	Stafford	Virginia	$36,574	$97,110	$106,322	131,885	42,178
92	Rappahannock	Virginia	$36,505	$56,438	$66,773	7,448	3,261
93	Oakland	Michigan	$36,458	$65,594	$84,182	1,213,406	486,332
94	Collier	Florida	$36,439	$55,843	$65,980	328,209	122,972
95	York	Virginia	$36,373	$82,073	$95,392	65,762	24,071
96	Hinsdale	Colorado	$36,365	$56,667	$76,000	809	388
Maryland			$36,354	$73,538	$88,738	5,834,299	2,146,240
97	Divide	North Dakota	$36,303	$55,057	$69,632	2,155	1,035
98	Anchorage	Alaska	$36,214	$77,454	$90,466	295,237	105,208
99	Roberts	Texas	$36,172	$67,321	$83,333	1,030	374
100	Union	South Dakota	$36,167	$63,468	$74,758	14,575	5,758
101	Carroll	Maryland	$36,153	$84,790	$100,643	167,261	59,909
102	Barnstable	Massachusetts	$36,142	$60,526	$76,311	215,449	95,398
103	Jefferson	Colorado	$36,087	$68,984	$84,957	540,669	219,562
104	Elbert	Colorado	$36,077	$82,118	$89,653	23,295	8,240
New Jersey			$36,027	$71,629	$87,347	8,832,406	3,186,418
105	St. Mary's	Maryland	$36,017	$85,672	$95,186	107,079	37,589
106	Sublette	Wyoming	$35,944	$77,900	$85,885	10,178	3,502
107	Dallas	Iowa	$35,844	$73,847	$90,092	69,526	26,262
108	Kendall	Texas	$35,827	$73,410	$86,750	34,951	12,760
Massachusetts			$35,763	$66,866	$84,900	6,605,058	2,530,147
109	Alameda	California	$35,763	$72,112	$88,618	1,535,248	545,071
110	Blaine	Idaho	$35,524	$64,042	$76,575	21,294	9,207
111	Scott	Minnesota	$35,467	$86,112	$97,693	132,774	45,630
112	Harford	Maryland	$35,425	$80,622	$92,642	246,664	90,708
113	Fayette	Georgia	$35,344	$79,977	$91,574	107,105	37,930
114	Denali	Alaska	$35,295	$72,500	$99,091	2,020	716
115	Plymouth	Massachusetts	$35,220	$75,092	$90,431	497,386	179,617
116	Saratoga	New York	$35,176	$69,826	$87,058	221,169	88,460
117	Essex	Massachusetts	$35,167	$67,311	$84,185	750,808	286,008
118	Platte	Missouri	$35,143	$67,721	$83,110	90,842	36,781
119	Union	New Jersey	$35,089	$68,507	$83,164	540,568	185,483
120	Placer	California	$34,886	$72,725	$87,352	355,924	132,709
121	El Dorado	California	$34,884	$69,297	$85,253	180,982	67,885
122	Routt	Colorado	$34,873	$62,002	$74,559	23,409	9,647
123	Lincoln	South Dakota	$34,839	$74,751	$85,666	46,693	17,250
124	Dakota	Minnesota	$34,828	$73,732	$88,889	402,306	154,275
125	Napa	California	$34,795	$70,443	$79,700	137,837	49,431
126	St. Louis County	Missouri	$34,795	$58,910	$75,532	999,725	403,293
127	Hartford	Connecticut	$34,698	$64,967	$81,805	895,827	347,874
128	Rockwall	Texas	$34,617	$86,119	$92,837	81,020	26,820
129	Rockland	New York	$34,591	$84,951	$99,649	315,069	98,326
130	Forsyth	Georgia	$34,582	$86,569	$99,573	182,916	58,080
131	Orange	North Carolina	$34,465	$55,569	$84,770	136,057	51,403
132	Geauga	Ohio	$34,455	$67,663	$81,952	93,610	34,621
133	Tolland	Connecticut	$34,392	$80,529	$95,996	152,366	54,327
134	Hillsborough	New Hampshire	$34,390	$69,829	$84,430	402,017	154,324
135	Baltimore County	Maryland	$34,374	$66,486	$81,116	812,261	313,912
136	Middlesex	New Jersey	$34,345	$79,596	$93,519	817,026	280,988
137	Yakutat	Alaska	$34,317	$72,500	$80,875	607	254
138	King George	Virginia	$34,234	$81,753	$90,752	24,151	8,314
139	Petersburg Census Area	Alaska	$34,183	$63,934	$84,861	3,806	1,643
140	Douglas	Nevada	$34,123	$60,100	$67,597	47,035	19,455
141	Fort Bend	Texas	$34,084	$85,297	$94,931	608,939	191,406
142	Olmsted	Minnesota	$34,073	$66,252	$83,250	146,063	57,262
143	Loving	Texas	$34,068	$68,750	$88,438	87	33
144	Orange	California	$34,057	$75,422	$84,765	3,051,771	995,512
145	Martin	Florida	$34,057	$49,846	$68,003	147,786	59,891
146	Summit	Colorado	$34,025	$63,697	$79,420	28,091	11,138
147	Monroe	Florida	$33,974	$53,607	$63,550	74,213	28,503
148	Denton	Texas	$33,855	$74,155	$90,086	687,857	243,394
149	Campbell	Wyoming	$33,850	$79,488	$84,746	46,901	17,108
150	Kent	Rhode Island	$33,814	$62,279	$80,038	165,628	68,880
151	Mountrail	North Dakota	$33,803	$68,722	$76,282	8,280	3,069
152	Oconee	Georgia	$33,801	$75,004	$82,625	33,240	11,485
153	Dunn	North Dakota	$33,788	$60,500	$76,346	3,786	1,438
154	New London	Connecticut	$33,782	$66,583	$82,076	274,090	107,066
155	Dane	Wisconsin	$33,712	$61,721	$83,509	496,762	206,982
156	Midland	Texas	$33,672	$62,993	$72,635	142,289	50,644
157	Llano	Texas	$33,634	$44,094	$60,285	19,223	8,519
158	Columbia	New York	$33,613	$57,336	$72,649	62,674	25,280
159	Dutchess	New York	$33,594	$72,525	$88,777	297,385	107,830
160	Oldham	Kentucky	$33,591	$83,391	$91,587	60,940	19,532
161	Warren	New Jersey	$33,555	$70,912	$85,091	108,150	41,463
162	Hanover	Virginia	$33,540	$75,070	$88,604	100,328	36,927
Virginia			$33,493	$63,907	$76,754	8,100,653	3,022,739
163	Storey	Nevada	$33,472	$61,573	$64,173	3,981	1,843
164	Dukes	Massachusetts	$33,363	$66,288	$82,452	16,739	5,891
165	Towner	North Dakota	$33,357	$55,521	$67,969	2,285	1,034
166	Shelby	Alabama	$33,313	$68,770	$82,558	198,366	74,144
167	Chittenden	Vermont	$33,281	$63,989	$83,887	157,637	62,587
168	Denver	Colorado	$33,251	$50,313	$63,705	619,297	266,069
169	Washtenaw	Michigan	$33,231	$59,055	$85,115	348,560	135,800
170	Travis	Texas	$33,206	$58,025	$73,951	1,063,248	411,876
171	Delaware County	Pennsylvania	$33,179	$64,041	$81,523	559,771	204,771
172	Warren	Ohio	$33,172	$72,487	$85,636	215,274	76,546
173	Madison	Mississippi	$33,170	$59,904	$73,775	97,151	36,342
174	Wake	North Carolina	$33,166	$66,006	$83,568	929,214	348,627
175	Grand Isle	Vermont	$33,159	$59,509	$69,722	6,984	3,023
New Hampshire			$33,134	$64,916	$79,886	1,319,171	518,245
176	Henrico	Virginia	$33,115	$61,048	$75,640	311,314	123,683
177	McKenzie	North Dakota	$33,078	$64,866	$77,366	7,377	2,666
178	Cobb	Georgia	$33,069	$63,920	$78,058	699,235	261,242
179	Foster	North Dakota	$33,063	$50,677	$68,547	3,355	1,555
180	Madison	Montana	$33,062	$47,762	$61,672	7,702	3,542
181	Ouray	Colorado	$33,015	$64,601	$72,229	4,475	1,943
182	Comal	Texas	$32,980	$65,839	$77,324	112,083	41,954
183	Cape May	New Jersey	$32,948	$56,494	$74,112	96,684	42,312
184	Ventura	California	$32,930	$76,544	$86,301	829,017	267,076
185	Montgomery	Texas	$32,911	$67,766	$79,541	472,162	163,462
186	Burke	North Dakota	$32,908	$53,693	$70,096	2,094	1,007
187	Worcester	Maryland	$32,887	$57,952	$68,840	51,479	20,530
188	Cumberland	Maine	$32,880	$57,461	$75,432	283,046	117,359
189	Burleigh	North Dakota	$32,876	$61,811	$82,235	83,906	34,703
190	Cook	Minnesota	$32,868	$52,215	$59,643	5,195	2,614
191	Palm Beach	Florida	$32,858	$52,432	$64,260	1,339,221	526,007
192	Sonoma	California	$32,835	$63,356	$75,896	487,469	185,660
193	Suffolk	Massachusetts	$32,835	$53,540	$61,449	735,701	288,240
194	Clackamas	Oregon	$32,781	$64,352	$76,549	380,532	146,527
Alaska			$32,651	$70,760	$82,870	720,316	251,899
195	Greeley	Kansas	$32,650	$52,847	$58,875	1,202	493
196	Hudson	New Jersey	$32,641	$58,442	$62,168	644,605	243,875
197	Gloucester	New Jersey	$32,600	$74,524	$87,913	289,098	104,145
198	Arapahoe	Colorado	$32,595	$60,651	$73,649	585,333	225,552
199	Valdez-Cordova Census Area	Alaska	$32,579	$74,878	$88,480	9,682	3,424
200	Chesterfield	Virginia	$32,572	$72,088	$83,877	320,430	113,637
201	New Haven	Connecticut	$32,523	$61,996	$79,408	862,611	328,013
202	Sitka	Alaska	$32,521	$69,405	$78,000	8,945	3,554
203	Beaufort	South Carolina	$32,503	$57,316	$66,878	165,354	64,417
204	Botetourt	Virginia	$32,490	$65,935	$74,798	33,076	12,825
205	Mecklenburg	North Carolina	$32,482	$55,444	$68,083	947,135	366,689
206	New Castle	Delaware	$32,406	$64,537	$79,954	542,784	200,739
New York State			$32,382	$58,003	$70,670	19,487,053	7,234,743
207	Nevada County	California	$32,346	$57,353	$70,148	98,509	40,991
208	Prince George's	Maryland	$32,344	$73,623	$84,808	873,481	303,441
209	McHenry	Illinois	$32,341	$76,145	$87,760	308,060	108,852
210	Albany	New York	$32,328	$59,394	$81,846	305,279	122,700
211	Sarasota	Florida	$32,313	$49,052	$61,339	383,094	170,555
212	Santa Fe	New Mexico	$32,298	$52,917	$64,737	145,400	61,012
213	Santa Cruz	California	$32,295	$66,519	$80,899	264,808	93,504
214	Oliver	North Dakota	$32,253	$71,250	$81,500	1,840	753
215	St. Croix	Wisconsin	$32,220	$68,426	$80,740	84,912	32,114
216	Essex	New Jersey	$32,181	$55,095	$69,448	785,853	277,302
217	Fairbanks North Star	Alaska	$32,143	$69,223	$82,930	98,656	35,588
218	Livingston	Michigan	$32,129	$72,359	$82,959	182,402	67,691
219	New Kent	Virginia	$32,068	$70,618	$78,995	18,791	6,886
220	Bowman	North Dakota	$32,045	$56,964	$76,750	3,168	1,354
221	Richland	Montana	$32,036	$58,112	$72,115	10,318	4,270
222	Cavalier	North Dakota	$32,028	$55,904	$72,946	3,952	1,754
223	Washington County	Wisconsin	$32,020	$66,159	$79,911	132,186	52,053
224	LaMoure	North Dakota	$31,989	$53,691	$65,958	4,136	1,955
225	Bottineau	North Dakota	$31,969	$51,667	$71,217	6,529	3,028
226	Virginia Beach City	Virginia	$31,934	$65,219	$76,285	442,151	164,944
227	Madison	Alabama	$31,933	$58,434	$75,766	339,279	132,975
228	Richmond	New York	$31,823	$72,569	$86,133	470,223	164,609
229	Cumberland	Pennsylvania	$31,791	$60,826	$77,057	237,449	95,286
230	Aleutians West Census Area	Alaska	$31,790	$81,853	$87,159	5,538	1,033
231	Dickinson	Iowa	$31,790	$56,136	$64,798	16,818	7,981
232	Kitsap	Washington	$31,769	$62,413	$74,993	252,687	97,622
233	Mercer	North Dakota	$31,767	$66,534	$80,827	8,456	3,650
234	Monroe	Illinois	$31,758	$68,482	$81,766	33,181	12,506
235	Roanoke County	Virginia	$31,728	$60,795	$75,860	92,824	37,928
236	Barnes	North Dakota	$31,721	$50,274	$67,150	11,085	4,871
237	Lane	Kansas	$31,694	$53,021	$64,886	1,616	808
238	Grand	Colorado	$31,684	$64,664	$74,418	14,535	5,227
239	Allegheny	Pennsylvania	$31,593	$51,366	$70,380	1,226,933	526,004
240	Ketchikan Gateway	Alaska	$31,589	$62,519	$85,638	13,595	5,295
241	St. Charles	Missouri	$31,586	$71,077	$83,907	365,101	135,974
242	Terrell	Texas	$31,578	$39,479	$68,750	837	403
243	Carroll	New Hampshire	$31,558	$50,866	$58,867	47,694	20,922
244	Worcester	Massachusetts	$31,537	$65,223	$81,519	802,688	299,663
245	Sioux	Nebraska	$31,517	$42,014	$56,813	1,229	553
246	Park	Colorado	$31,504	$61,570	$76,104	16,131	7,038
247	Kent	Maryland	$31,502	$56,259	$72,360	20,130	7,498
248	Adams	North Dakota	$31,502	$47,798	$65,859	2,328	1,101
249	Harris	Georgia	$31,482	$69,223	$82,259	32,267	11,426
250	Leelanau	Michigan	$31,462	$55,018	$66,570	21,682	9,103
251	Steele	North Dakota	$31,455	$55,735	$67,159	1,976	890
252	Daniels	Montana	$31,449	$46,100	$60,000	1,778	890
253	Stark	North Dakota	$31,412	$62,559	$75,333	25,666	10,439
254	Sheridan	Montana	$31,378	$48,667	$68,769	3,473	1,612
255	Spotsylvania	Virginia	$31,360	$78,345	$87,374	124,319	41,709
256	Snohomish	Washington	$31,349	$68,381	$80,856	724,627	268,722
257	Mathews	Virginia	$31,342	$55,192	$71,441	8,943	3,856
258	Merrimack	New Hampshire	$31,310	$65,353	$80,655	146,710	56,812
259	Miner	South Dakota	$31,288	$48,477	$60,083	2,355	1,053
260	Kendall	Illinois	$31,276	$81,765	$91,368	116,366	38,075
261	Kenai Peninsula	Alaska	$31,256	$61,793	$75,689	56,163	21,720
262	Powhatan	Virginia	$31,252	$76,548	$87,045	28,108	9,544
263	Piatt	Illinois	$31,190	$63,027	$73,890	16,620	6,546
264	Renville	North Dakota	$31,178	$60,847	$77,143	2,512	1,041
265	Chatham	North Carolina	$31,175	$57,091	$66,875	64,886	26,017
266	Grundy	Iowa	$31,164	$56,827	$70,837	12,416	5,073
267	Glasscock	Texas	$31,135	$69,107	$98,409	1,176	409
Colorado			$31,109	$58,433	$72,687	5,119,329	1,977,591
268	Haines	Alaska	$31,096	$52,866	$68,207	2,546	1,245
269	Washington County	Oregon	$31,078	$64,180	$76,711	539,608	201,771
270	Teller	Colorado	$31,075	$59,040	$73,379	23,276	9,434
271	Williamson	Texas	$31,070	$71,803	$82,568	441,445	154,948
272	McLean	North Dakota	$30,992	$53,565	$67,636	9,163	4,021
273	Butler	Pennsylvania	$30,957	$58,230	$74,043	184,535	73,213
274	Columbia	Georgia	$30,949	$69,306	$77,373	128,213	43,975
275	Converse	Wyoming	$30,941	$63,918	$75,231	13,937	5,746
276	Island	Washington	$30,941	$58,455	$69,775	78,806	33,096
277	Stanley	South Dakota	$30,933	$54,620	$61,083	2,966	1,273
278	Windsor	Vermont	$30,932	$52,460	$70,467	56,416	25,024
279	Woodford	Illinois	$30,926	$66,639	$78,590	38,903	14,362
280	Galveston	Texas	$30,926	$61,877	$76,204	296,669	110,032
281	Audubon	Iowa	$30,919	$48,313	$61,845	6,002	2,684
Minnesota			$30,913	$59,836	$74,683	5,347,740	2,107,232
282	Isle of Wight	Virginia	$30,903	$63,942	$77,524	35,373	13,560
283	Fluvanna	Virginia	$30,881	$68,288	$79,101	25,860	9,462
Washington			$30,742	$59,478	$72,168	6,819,579	2,629,126
284	Larimer	Colorado	$30,740	$58,626	$76,194	305,798	121,423
285	Grafton	New Hampshire	$30,738	$54,912	$71,158	89,166	35,111
286	Lancaster	Virginia	$30,737	$49,248	$66,189	11,303	5,182
287	Medina	Ohio	$30,707	$65,951	$77,729	173,252	65,499
288	Parker	Texas	$30,692	$64,515	$78,626	118,478	42,322
289	San Diego	California	$30,668	$62,962	$73,495	3,138,265	1,076,483
290	Door	Wisconsin	$30,657	$50,438	$63,361	27,826	13,459
291	Anoka	Minnesota	$30,647	$70,380	$81,798	334,027	122,625
292	Camden	New Jersey	$30,592	$61,683	$77,369	513,512	187,941
293	Slope	North Dakota	$30,586	$61,667	$74,167	738	296
294	Orange	New York	$30,583	$70,458	$85,100	373,902	125,317
295	Indian River	Florida	$30,532	$44,772	$56,151	139,356	58,038
296	Middlesex	Virginia	$30,531	$53,309	$64,313	10,851	4,400
297	Dare	North Carolina	$30,529	$55,481	$64,404	34,289	14,624
298	Cass	North Dakota	$30,529	$52,590	$74,024	154,080	65,816
299	Belknap	New Hampshire	$30,518	$58,654	$67,570	60,216	25,049
300	Sweetwater	Wyoming	$30,517	$71,525	$81,595	44,437	16,682
301	Ocean	New Jersey	$30,477	$61,136	$76,822	578,902	221,774
302	Multnomah	Oregon	$30,475	$52,511	$65,897	747,641	305,939
Rhode Island			$30,469	$56,361	$72,717	1,051,695	410,058
303	McLean	Illinois	$30,460	$62,089	$83,812	171,240	64,016
304	Polk	Iowa	$30,442	$59,018	$73,043	438,307	173,164
305	Ulster	New York	$30,442	$58,590	$72,632	182,086	69,862
306	Hodgeman	Kansas	$30,440	$52,375	$67,000	1,946	821
307	Nelson	North Dakota	$30,432	$49,839	$64,792	3,101	1,474
308	Jefferson	Montana	$30,397	$60,863	$76,469	11,434	4,527
309	Will	Illinois	$30,377	$76,147	$86,747	679,688	222,652
310	St. Tammany	Louisiana	$30,363	$60,799	$74,834	236,832	87,518
311	Honolulu	Hawaii	$30,361	$72,764	$85,440	964,678	309,803
312	Santa Barbara	California	$30,352	$62,779	$72,602	427,288	141,720
313	Warren	New York	$30,351	$55,904	$66,622	65,584	28,081
314	Hughes	South Dakota	$30,284	$59,338	$83,474	17,238	6,992
315	Ness	Kansas	$30,223	$48,800	$61,940	3,095	1,340
90%	90th Percentile		$30,220				
316	Sully	South Dakota	$30,218	$54,524	$69,345	1,420	606
317	Sarpy	Nebraska	$30,189	$69,965	$80,985	162,728	59,606
318	Cook	Illinois	$30,183	$54,548	$66,187	5,212,372	1,933,335
319	Charleston	South Carolina	$30,158	$50,792	$65,394	358,736	143,717
320	La Plata	Colorado	$30,151	$58,080	$67,732	52,039	20,947
321	Chambers	Texas	$30,140	$72,489	$82,601	35,570	12,147
322	Gillespie	Texas	$30,117	$53,668	$65,457	25,003	10,655
323	Thomas	Nebraska	$30,116	$55,089	$63,333	734	323
324	Frederick	Virginia	$30,112	$68,424	$76,530	79,453	29,172
325	Wheeler	Texas	$30,097	$51,766	$63,000	5,526	2,319
326	Kane	Illinois	$30,082	$69,530	$80,085	518,380	170,358
327	Hood	Texas	$30,046	$55,754	$64,873	51,756	20,758
328	Greene	Ohio	$30,040	$58,080	$73,972	162,588	62,836
329	Saunders	Nebraska	$30,039	$59,870	$74,235	20,800	8,142
330	Goliad	Texas	$30,031	$50,923	$63,672	7,281	3,028
331	Rensselaer	New York	$29,987	$59,432	$74,519	159,565	64,242
332	Sangamon	Illinois	$29,974	$55,449	$71,338	198,269	82,807
333	San Luis Obispo	California	$29,954	$58,697	$74,885	272,094	102,154
334	Sargent	North Dakota	$29,950	$53,381	$67,132	3,859	1,741
335	Linn	Iowa	$29,943	$57,260	$75,761	213,425	86,052
336	Goodhue	Minnesota	$29,932	$56,836	$73,075	46,259	18,711
337	Warrick	Indiana	$29,927	$62,351	$72,764	60,163	22,454
338	Chesapeake City	Virginia	$29,905	$69,743	$80,767	225,597	79,421
339	Ontario	New York	$29,904	$56,479	$70,381	108,311	43,794
340	Natrona	Wyoming	$29,877	$57,791	$69,098	77,343	31,116
341	King	Texas	$29,836	$65,000	$76,250	321	126
342	Hendricks	Indiana	$29,830	$68,297	$79,943	148,623	52,946
Delaware			$29,819	$59,878	$71,811	908,446	335,707
343	Plumas	California	$29,806	$45,794	$55,183	19,586	8,997
344	Lander	Nevada	$29,800	$72,742	$75,857	5,844	2,010
345	Archuleta	Colorado	$29,793	$48,933	$58,222	12,109	4,881
346	Washington County	Vermont	$29,761	$57,281	$70,640	59,427	24,661
347	Thurston	Washington	$29,744	$62,229	$74,207	256,080	100,801
North Dakota			$29,732	$53,741	$70,767	689,781	287,270
348	Emmet	Michigan	$29,718	$50,929	$61,644	32,858	13,545
349	Hamilton	Ohio	$29,681	$48,593	$65,392	802,481	327,914
350	New Hanover	North Carolina	$29,679	$49,835	$67,938	206,403	86,010
351	Jo Daviess	Illinois	$29,675	$50,817	$63,490	22,602	9,616
Illinois			$29,666	$56,797	$70,344	12,848,554	4,772,723
352	Cass	Nebraska	$29,638	$64,697	$75,769	25,222	9,701
353	Wright	Minnesota	$29,623	$71,598	$81,683	126,142	44,983
354	Cherokee	Georgia	$29,615	$67,261	$78,328	218,277	76,144
355	Jefferson	West Virginia	$29,605	$65,304	$77,447	54,131	19,889
356	Montour	Pennsylvania	$29,600	$51,482	$62,248	18,379	7,233
357	Johnson	Iowa	$29,592	$53,424	$79,964	134,034	54,005
358	Cameron	Louisiana	$29,559	$64,574	$71,310	6,789	2,529
359	Hemphill	Texas	$29,544	$56,379	$66,513	3,959	1,440
360	Midland	Michigan	$29,536	$53,076	$65,735	83,842	33,717
361	Matanuska-Susitna	Alaska	$29,534	$71,037	$81,821	91,519	31,123
California			$29,527	$61,094	$69,661	37,659,181	12,542,460
362	Cecil	Maryland	$29,518	$66,689	$79,128	101,435	36,394
363	Maui	Hawaii	$29,517	$63,512	$75,407	156,633	52,623
364	Ramsey	Minnesota	$29,484	$54,247	$71,206	515,732	205,395
365	Hampshire	Massachusetts	$29,460	$61,227	$81,385	159,267	58,828
366	Southeast Fairbanks Census Area	Alaska	$29,437	$56,801	$66,369	7,047	2,326
367	Clay	Missouri	$29,406	$60,936	$73,380	225,116	86,934
368	Morton	North Dakota	$29,389	$60,065	$69,894	27,874	11,416
369	Strafford	New Hampshire	$29,369	$58,825	$73,260	123,836	46,968
370	Durham	North Carolina	$29,347	$51,853	$66,448	276,494	111,276
371	Calaveras	California	$29,329	$55,295	$68,401	45,147	18,702
372	Washington County	Nebraska	$29,328	$65,409	$83,670	20,234	7,647
Hawaii			$29,305	$67,402	$79,963	1,376,298	449,771
373	Wells	North Dakota	$29,301	$44,132	$57,125	4,220	1,949
374	Berkshire	Massachusetts	$29,294	$48,450	$65,216	130,545	55,301
375	Woodford	Kentucky	$29,277	$57,580	$71,995	24,988	9,698
376	Northampton	Pennsylvania	$29,266	$60,097	$73,386	298,439	112,189
377	Pinellas	Florida	$29,262	$45,535	$59,491	920,015	401,708
378	Franklin	Massachusetts	$29,259	$53,663	$67,785	71,408	30,534
379	Fayette	Kentucky	$29,251	$48,398	$67,973	300,843	123,142
380	Boone	Kentucky	$29,235	$67,225	$78,101	121,214	43,255
381	Dauphin	Pennsylvania	$29,234	$54,066	$68,368	269,035	108,831
382	Sheridan	North Dakota	$29,219	$43,250	$48,403	1,313	614
383	Bennington	Vermont	$29,196	$50,221	$61,270	36,871	15,442
384	Posey	Indiana	$29,187	$58,750	$73,319	25,713	10,050
385	Douglas	Nebraska	$29,180	$53,325	$69,754	524,697	204,226
Vermont			$29,167	$54,267	$68,111	625,904	257,004
386	Suffolk City	Virginia	$29,135	$66,085	$78,565	84,842	30,492
387	Lake	Ohio	$29,132	$56,018	$69,939	229,850	94,048
388	Pope	Minnesota	$29,128	$52,350	$64,740	10,957	4,758
389	Kossuth	Iowa	$29,127	$51,812	$64,283	15,437	6,728
390	York	Maine	$29,125	$57,348	$70,642	198,220	81,293
391	Randall	Texas	$29,124	$58,529	$73,144	123,062	48,080
392	Dodge	Minnesota	$29,107	$69,301	$81,702	20,159	7,326
393	Warren	Iowa	$29,088	$62,535	$74,558	46,631	17,378
394	Brazoria	Texas	$29,081	$67,603	$79,880	319,493	107,717
395	Walsh	North Dakota	$29,072	$48,592	$61,156	11,102	4,948
396	Clay	Iowa	$29,060	$49,035	$64,651	16,604	7,148
397	Lipscomb	Texas	$29,017	$57,978	$64,934	3,379	1,115
398	Scott	Iowa	$28,948	$52,735	$70,480	167,080	67,049
399	Gallatin	Montana	$28,939	$52,833	$69,556	91,499	36,973
400	Solano	California	$28,929	$67,177	$76,932	417,258	141,464
401	Nassau	Florida	$28,926	$55,315	$63,888	74,163	28,044
402	Moore	North Carolina	$28,913	$49,544	$62,099	89,425	36,997
403	Calumet	Wisconsin	$28,907	$65,130	$75,563	49,288	18,381
404	Kidder	North Dakota	$28,904	$50,000	$57,675	2,429	1,146
Wyoming			$28,902	$57,406	$70,868	570,134	222,846
405	Lafayette	Louisiana	$28,901	$51,462	$67,061	224,719	86,504
406	Union	North Carolina	$28,894	$65,892	$74,132	205,426	68,211
407	Warren	Virginia	$28,889	$61,610	$72,597	37,836	14,387
408	Stillwater	Montana	$28,868	$57,906	$69,375	9,173	3,757
409	El Paso	Colorado	$28,867	$57,125	$70,728	634,423	237,039
410	Windham	Vermont	$28,867	$50,234	$63,509	44,216	19,417
411	Union	Ohio	$28,852	$65,086	$79,744	52,683	18,216
412	Bristol	Massachusetts	$28,837	$55,298	$72,018	549,870	210,037
413	Sagadahoc	Maine	$28,829	$56,733	$69,561	35,194	15,022
414	DeKalb	Georgia	$28,810	$50,856	$60,182	700,308	264,496
415	Hoonah-Angoon Census Area	Alaska	$28,806	$49,545	$60,000	2,141	930
416	Salem	New Jersey	$28,772	$59,718	$74,469	65,825	25,003
417	Weston	Wyoming	$28,764	$55,461	$74,531	7,153	2,975
418	Clermont	Ohio	$28,761	$60,365	$71,914	198,417	73,728
419	Manassas City	Virginia	$28,752	$71,036	$75,810	39,317	12,072
420	Onondaga	New York	$28,746	$54,242	$70,143	467,202	184,855
421	Stevens	Minnesota	$28,746	$54,206	$71,563	9,723	3,700
422	Monroe	New York	$28,732	$52,394	$68,524	746,548	297,040
423	Bremer	Iowa	$28,727	$61,216	$75,486	24,387	9,258
424	Grundy	Illinois	$28,725	$64,541	$78,918	50,064	18,082
425	Addison	Vermont	$28,722	$57,565	$69,157	36,811	14,164
426	Bath	Virginia	$28,704	$51,365	$55,112	4,686	2,101
427	Bedford County	Virginia	$28,697	$57,596	$69,792	69,175	27,233
428	Seminole	Florida	$28,675	$58,175	$68,680	427,184	147,529
429	Gloucester	Virginia	$28,673	$60,519	$72,719	36,868	13,889
430	Washoe	Nevada	$28,670	$53,040	$64,556	425,495	163,198
431	Porter	Indiana	$28,669	$62,794	$76,004	165,168	61,502
432	Okaloosa	Florida	$28,600	$54,684	$64,668	185,852	73,253
433	Benton	Washington	$28,583	$60,485	$72,126	178,992	65,675
434	Sullivan	New Hampshire	$28,582	$54,463	$65,969	43,398	17,808
435	Johnson	Indiana	$28,575	$61,231	$73,059	141,796	52,239
436	Northumberland	Virginia	$28,568	$51,342	$60,747	12,334	5,691
437	Fallon	Montana	$28,563	$51,164	$66,544	3,085	1,199
438	Kodiak Island	Alaska	$28,562	$68,718	$73,887	13,850	4,501
439	Ward	North Dakota	$28,557	$56,580	$67,738	64,008	25,173
440	Powder River	Montana	$28,528	$46,250	$56,250	1,669	720
441	Laramie	Wyoming	$28,505	$55,864	$71,483	93,073	36,859
Pennsylvania			$28,502	$52,548	$66,646	12,731,381	4,958,427
442	Dundy	Nebraska	$28,502	$47,431	$51,932	1,994	893
443	Wrangell	Alaska	$28,474	$45,841	$55,286	2,371	1,149
444	Davidson	Tennessee	$28,467	$47,335	$58,535	638,395	256,745
445	Clinton	Michigan	$28,449	$60,466	$72,958	75,802	28,534
446	Skamania	Washington	$28,449	$53,712	$67,354	11,126	4,452
447	Peoria	Illinois	$28,438	$50,712	$65,884	187,117	75,892
448	Eddy	New Mexico	$28,438	$49,165	$60,891	54,284	19,866
449	Washington County	Pennsylvania	$28,433	$53,693	$68,300	208,047	84,098
450	Miami	Kansas	$28,412	$58,936	$73,528	32,682	12,334
451	Lewis and Clark	Montana	$28,400	$56,243	$70,259	64,143	26,555
452	Seward	Nebraska	$28,359	$59,435	$74,309	16,824	6,165
453	Elko	Nevada	$28,358	$70,238	$75,231	50,023	17,599
454	Custer	South Dakota	$28,356	$50,074	$61,917	8,306	3,731
455	McHenry	North Dakota	$28,331	$45,343	$61,367	5,593	2,573
456	Menard	Illinois	$28,330	$58,190	$73,969	12,687	5,071
457	Douglas	South Dakota	$28,323	$49,200	$58,529	3,000	1,258
458	Schenectady	New York	$28,319	$56,061	$73,910	154,821	58,059
459	Washakie	Wyoming	$28,308	$47,104	$64,608	8,468	3,468
460	Cheyenne	Nebraska	$28,296	$51,529	$64,504	10,022	4,405
461	Franklin	Ohio	$28,283	$50,877	$64,693	1,181,824	468,295
462	Wabasha	Minnesota	$28,282	$53,057	$66,629	21,549	8,890
463	Columbia	Wisconsin	$28,273	$57,922	$70,208	56,647	22,735
464	Tarrant	Texas	$28,266	$56,853	$67,436	1,848,423	659,736
465	Jefferson	Washington	$28,266	$46,320	$62,737	29,882	13,801
466	Hamilton	New York	$28,265	$51,522	$60,170	4,813	1,854
467	Chase	Nebraska	$28,241	$45,610	$51,810	3,984	1,697
468	Pierce	Washington	$28,223	$59,204	$70,077	805,434	300,623
469	Crook	Wyoming	$28,212	$53,237	$60,909	7,110	3,010
470	York	Nebraska	$28,207	$49,633	$63,940	13,762	5,501
471	Broward	Florida	$28,205	$51,251	$61,526	1,784,889	663,458
472	Fayette	Tennessee	$28,201	$56,618	$65,276	38,502	14,535
473	Franklin	Texas	$28,189	$45,523	$61,723	10,611	4,304
474	Outagamie	Wisconsin	$28,186	$58,318	$71,464	178,013	69,572
475	Ascension	Louisiana	$28,178	$69,070	$77,640	109,920	38,287
476	Kanawha	West Virginia	$28,174	$46,085	$58,481	192,311	82,756
United States			$28,155	$53,046	$64,719	311,536,594	115,610,216
477	Graham	Kansas	$28,146	$47,500	$59,000	2,604	1,192
478	Knox	Tennessee	$28,136	$47,694	$64,310	436,983	181,100
479	Somervell	Texas	$28,134	$55,269	$70,625	8,537	3,193
480	York	Pennsylvania	$28,132	$58,745	$70,001	436,339	167,592
481	Grant	North Dakota	$28,129	$41,694	$59,531	2,372	1,113
482	Hancock	Indiana	$28,111	$62,981	$72,559	70,466	26,071
483	O'Brien	Iowa	$28,086	$48,185	$63,912	14,249	6,098
484	Ramsey	North Dakota	$28,081	$48,604	$63,380	11,473	4,826
485	Johnson	Wyoming	$28,072	$57,004	$63,343	8,595	3,679
486	Sherburne	Minnesota	$28,071	$73,098	$80,939	89,120	29,948
487	Lincoln	Maine	$28,070	$50,181	$59,398	34,297	14,817
488	Iowa County	Iowa	$28,068	$58,008	$73,465	16,323	6,745
489	Eureka	Nevada	$28,056	$64,632	$94,648	1,804	733
490	Irion	Texas	$28,055	$50,357	$58,875	1,603	654
491	Westmoreland	Pennsylvania	$28,051	$50,736	$65,027	364,090	152,109
492	Mono	California	$28,046	$61,757	$72,237	14,217	5,268
493	Tazewell	Illinois	$28,037	$56,067	$68,994	135,747	54,428
494	Guthrie	Iowa	$28,030	$50,609	$62,036	10,843	4,641
495	Traverse	Minnesota	$28,030	$45,714	$62,258	3,507	1,510
496	Baylor	Texas	$28,021	$33,445	$56,656	3,678	1,798
497	Lac qui Parle	Minnesota	$28,014	$48,468	$60,873	7,184	3,074
498	Ottawa	Ohio	$27,979	$53,202	$65,311	41,372	17,614
499	Erie	New York	$27,978	$50,653	$65,897	919,230	380,152
500	Putnam	West Virginia	$27,957	$54,854	$65,900	56,033	21,391
501	Sheridan	Wyoming	$27,948	$52,008	$67,673	29,376	12,381
502	Plymouth	Iowa	$27,942	$58,888	$73,086	24,923	9,867
503	Perkins	Nebraska	$27,931	$58,625	$66,000	2,949	1,262
504	Jefferson	Kentucky	$27,925	$46,959	$61,622	746,580	305,832
505	Lehigh	Pennsylvania	$27,923	$54,923	$67,081	352,068	133,289
506	Chisago	Minnesota	$27,914	$67,157	$75,513	53,691	19,569
507	Hettinger	North Dakota	$27,910	$47,743	$65,577	2,539	1,097
508	Emmet	Iowa	$27,908	$48,601	$63,310	10,141	4,119
509	Harris	Texas	$27,899	$53,137	$60,594	4,182,285	1,434,694
510	Windham	Connecticut	$27,893	$59,333	$74,484	118,115	44,018
511	Logan	North Dakota	$27,887	$49,076	$60,903	1,966	827
512	Lake	Minnesota	$27,883	$46,939	$61,548	10,825	4,982
513	Clark	South Dakota	$27,878	$49,055	$65,089	3,635	1,431
514	Cheshire	New Hampshire	$27,874	$55,155	$70,026	76,896	30,458
515	Knox	Maine	$27,865	$49,755	$60,581	39,694	16,941
516	Wilson	Tennessee	$27,864	$60,390	$70,024	116,948	42,800
517	Greene	Georgia	$27,828	$42,565	$51,000	16,091	6,353
518	Park	Wyoming	$27,824	$53,951	$64,802	28,557	11,801
519	Summit	Ohio	$27,818	$49,669	$64,157	541,592	220,375
520	Pembina	North Dakota	$27,817	$49,846	$62,147	7,327	3,328
521	Scott	Kentucky	$27,802	$61,893	$71,455	48,149	17,989
522	Clinton	Illinois	$27,802	$61,720	$76,109	37,891	14,051
523	Archer	Texas	$27,800	$56,452	$68,419	8,853	3,342
524	Hancock	Maine	$27,797	$47,460	$60,022	54,557	24,355
525	Kearney	Nebraska	$27,796	$56,466	$62,308	6,518	2,621
526	Brewster	Texas	$27,796	$40,477	$55,893	9,244	4,152
527	Sumner	Tennessee	$27,795	$55,509	$64,806	163,724	60,835
528	Le Sueur	Minnesota	$27,793	$58,922	$70,426	27,758	10,997
529	Brown	Wisconsin	$27,787	$53,119	$67,159	250,597	98,962
530	Yellowstone	Montana	$27,761	$51,342	$65,486	150,156	61,023
531	Spink	South Dakota	$27,757	$48,911	$61,063	6,522	2,624
532	Los Angeles	California	$27,749	$55,909	$62,237	9,893,481	3,230,383
533	Yolo	California	$27,730	$55,918	$74,687	202,288	70,347
534	Sutton	Texas	$27,721	$53,806	$60,395	4,058	1,445
535	Douglas	Minnesota	$27,716	$50,905	$65,133	36,264	15,757
536	Richland	North Dakota	$27,713	$53,759	$72,409	16,258	6,614
537	Kenton	Kentucky	$27,704	$54,270	$66,229	160,828	61,800
538	Pike	Pennsylvania	$27,691	$59,340	$68,671	57,179	21,581
539	Emmons	North Dakota	$27,690	$38,477	$48,816	3,521	1,634
540	Madison	Iowa	$27,685	$57,581	$68,812	15,606	6,092
541	Moody	South Dakota	$27,682	$51,791	$62,624	6,460	2,686
542	Clark	Washington	$27,681	$58,225	$68,276	432,549	158,855
543	Tulsa	Oklahoma	$27,676	$48,181	$60,745	609,610	241,915
544	Butler	Nebraska	$27,673	$50,247	$65,225	8,334	3,482
545	Grand Traverse	Michigan	$27,660	$51,766	$63,616	88,182	34,655
546	Orange	Virginia	$27,655	$60,287	$67,802	33,934	12,621
547	Gunnison	Colorado	$27,654	$52,332	$67,047	15,421	6,293
548	Polk	Nebraska	$27,639	$52,848	$63,664	5,342	2,232
549	Coffey	Kansas	$27,627	$51,793	$66,026	8,516	3,501
550	Colonial Heights City	Virginia	$27,610	$50,835	$66,704	17,481	7,017
551	Marathon	Wisconsin	$27,607	$53,363	$64,950	134,497	53,079
552	Carbon	Montana	$27,599	$47,831	$60,375	10,126	4,322
553	Jefferson	Iowa	$27,593	$48,814	$60,989	16,800	6,919
554	Rio Blanco	Colorado	$27,586	$60,128	$75,978	6,770	2,638
555	Bryan	Georgia	$27,556	$64,707	$74,513	31,410	11,230
556	Canadian	Oklahoma	$27,552	$63,629	$72,849	119,546	41,876
557	Deuel	South Dakota	$27,525	$51,632	$64,432	4,362	1,789
558	Deschutes	Oregon	$27,524	$50,209	$61,488	160,565	64,568
Wisconsin			$27,523	$52,413	$66,534	5,706,871	2,288,332
559	East Baton Rouge	Louisiana	$27,505	$48,506	$63,558	441,901	167,422
560	Sumter	Florida	$27,504	$48,493	$58,068	98,409	43,507
561	Mason	Texas	$27,504	$46,865	$59,531	4,034	1,699
562	Kimble	Texas	$27,502	$43,424	$53,145	4,566	1,895
563	Lawrence	South Dakota	$27,498	$43,273	$66,387	24,305	10,597
564	Carteret	North Carolina	$27,496	$46,534	$57,328	67,198	29,158
565	Wibaux	Montana	$27,492	$41,875	$67,361	928	409
566	Kingsbury	South Dakota	$27,485	$51,373	$61,858	5,142	2,311
567	Grant	Oklahoma	$27,469	$46,625	$58,478	4,522	1,951
568	Cass	Missouri	$27,463	$60,350	$68,480	99,875	37,307
569	Pierce	Wisconsin	$27,462	$59,226	$74,867	40,870	15,069
570	McPherson	Kansas	$27,462	$54,167	$68,039	29,297	11,540
571	Ada	Idaho	$27,452	$55,210	$67,641	401,673	151,600
572	Murray	Minnesota	$27,450	$52,160	$63,545	8,639	3,820
573	Inyo	California	$27,441	$44,796	$70,185	18,482	7,873
574	Andrews	Texas	$27,429	$57,825	$76,563	15,554	5,217
575	Bossier	Louisiana	$27,429	$53,248	$67,961	119,947	45,776
576	Cuyahoga	Ohio	$27,423	$43,804	$59,745	1,272,533	534,476
577	Tompkins	New York	$27,418	$51,393	$73,828	102,270	38,409
578	Pulaski	Arkansas	$27,414	$46,013	$58,688	386,106	153,720
579	Madison	Illinois	$27,407	$53,633	$67,064	268,373	107,238
580	Franklin	Vermont	$27,398	$56,240	$68,408	48,019	18,616
581	Atlantic	New Jersey	$27,391	$54,235	$66,619	274,960	101,091
582	Warren	Indiana	$27,390	$52,317	$61,784	8,464	3,283
583	Culpeper	Virginia	$27,379	$64,423	$75,328	47,330	16,039
584	McMullen	Texas	$27,375	$39,500	$56,591	616	254
585	Rogers	Oklahoma	$27,365	$58,525	$67,554	87,730	32,693
586	Jackson	Minnesota	$27,361	$51,681	$64,625	10,263	4,469
587	Bartholomew	Indiana	$27,359	$54,165	$64,614	77,930	30,041
588	Stutsman	North Dakota	$27,351	$50,120	$65,032	21,046	8,873
589	Lee	Florida	$27,348	$47,439	$56,847	633,968	241,531
590	Amador	California	$27,347	$53,684	$68,593	37,422	14,262
591	Dawson	Georgia	$27,330	$53,525	$60,910	22,387	8,506
592	Butler	Kansas	$27,329	$56,454	$70,484	65,786	24,270
593	Roger Mills	Oklahoma	$27,326	$53,885	$61,583	3,713	1,305
594	Eddy	North Dakota	$27,323	$44,250	$55,500	2,382	1,104
595	Manatee	Florida	$27,322	$47,876	$58,263	329,487	131,197
596	Rockingham	Virginia	$27,298	$52,195	$60,869	76,885	29,440
597	Madison	Virginia	$27,296	$53,459	$60,441	13,249	5,024
598	Cerro Gordo	Iowa	$27,291	$44,795	$61,804	43,932	19,967
599	Orange	Vermont	$27,289	$52,480	$63,253	28,966	11,962
600	Adams	Pennsylvania	$27,284	$59,492	$69,551	101,496	38,141
601	Yankton	South Dakota	$27,268	$52,578	$67,897	22,518	8,698
602	Charlottesville City	Virginia	$27,268	$44,601	$65,579	43,663	17,443
603	Steele	Minnesota	$27,259	$56,480	$71,627	36,512	14,354
604	Maricopa	Arizona	$27,256	$53,596	$63,910	3,889,161	1,411,727
605	Wilson	Texas	$27,238	$64,571	$71,234	43,753	15,157
606	Tioga	New York	$27,230	$55,726	$66,950	50,789	20,202
607	Hamilton	Tennessee	$27,229	$46,702	$60,329	340,973	135,496
608	Fredericksburg City	Virginia	$27,222	$47,040	$57,404	25,931	9,779
609	Deuel	Nebraska	$27,199	$44,922	$58,500	1,952	855
610	Griggs	North Dakota	$27,197	$45,542	$63,150	2,370	1,149
611	Floyd	Indiana	$27,185	$53,961	$66,670	75,120	29,087
612	Richmond City	Virginia	$27,184	$40,496	$48,681	207,878	84,833
613	Ellis	Oklahoma	$27,183	$47,344	$59,535	4,120	1,734
614	Chaffee	Colorado	$27,182	$46,504	$59,631	18,063	7,832
615	Major	Oklahoma	$27,168	$49,905	$60,313	7,604	3,084
616	McCone	Montana	$27,161	$46,667	$59,375	1,794	760
617	Lamoille	Vermont	$27,157	$52,686	$64,500	24,670	10,046
618	Decatur	Kansas	$27,154	$39,333	$44,243	2,933	1,482
619	Passaic	New Jersey	$27,152	$57,654	$67,890	502,854	162,543
620	Boone	Iowa	$27,149	$51,826	$67,769	26,310	10,574
621	Hillsborough	Florida	$27,149	$49,596	$59,894	1,257,913	471,340
622	Racine	Wisconsin	$27,141	$54,090	$66,811	195,045	75,087
623	Lancaster	Nebraska	$27,141	$51,574	$68,714	289,873	115,237
624	Brown	South Dakota	$27,138	$51,398	$64,824	36,982	15,590
625	Walworth	Wisconsin	$27,130	$54,020	$68,838	102,619	39,929
626	Carroll	Illinois	$27,118	$47,985	$56,063	15,199	6,671
627	Henry	Illinois	$27,117	$52,940	$64,959	50,260	20,393
628	Mills	Iowa	$27,101	$63,076	$75,167	14,983	5,375
629	Traill	North Dakota	$27,098	$48,767	$71,359	8,125	3,306
80%	80th Percentile		$27,080				
630	Lebanon	Pennsylvania	$27,074	$54,818	$64,877	134,411	52,023
631	Putnam	Illinois	$27,074	$54,196	$68,179	5,927	2,471
632	Skagit	Washington	$27,065	$55,925	$64,951	117,641	45,293
633	Green	Wisconsin	$27,060	$55,584	$68,493	36,901	14,640
634	Dearborn	Indiana	$27,058	$56,946	$70,251	49,975	18,556
635	Washington County	Oklahoma	$27,053	$48,687	$58,761	51,329	21,332
636	Effingham	Illinois	$27,051	$52,108	$64,204	34,274	13,544
637	Loudon	Tennessee	$27,045	$51,074	$60,003	49,188	19,543
638	Oneida	Wisconsin	$27,041	$45,759	$58,214	35,868	15,797
639	Shelby	Kentucky	$27,039	$57,298	$70,044	42,911	15,469
640	Buchanan	Iowa	$27,038	$55,553	$69,097	20,954	8,187
641	Fayette	Texas	$27,032	$48,015	$60,929	24,662	9,999
642	Fairfield	Ohio	$27,031	$58,786	$70,352	147,110	54,309
Iowa			$27,027	$51,843	$65,802	3,062,553	1,226,547
643	Grand Forks	North Dakota	$27,026	$46,745	$70,875	67,357	27,465
644	Leavenworth	Kansas	$27,017	$63,435	$77,727	77,002	26,358
645	Lake	South Dakota	$27,015	$48,936	$66,652	11,564	4,655
646	Brevard	Florida	$27,009	$48,039	$59,810	545,667	220,277
647	Pennington	South Dakota	$27,000	$50,833	$64,273	102,752	40,723
648	Greene	Virginia	$26,998	$59,358	$70,074	18,577	6,897
649	Mariposa	California	$26,988	$49,820	$62,278	18,061	7,238
650	Young	Texas	$26,979	$44,429	$58,875	18,395	7,186
651	Thayer	Nebraska	$26,965	$44,422	$53,493	5,187	2,343
652	Jeff Davis	Texas	$26,958	$49,056	$60,341	2,311	989
653	Louisa	Virginia	$26,956	$54,518	$66,882	33,384	13,046
654	Winnebago	Wisconsin	$26,955	$51,010	$66,466	167,860	68,140
655	Garfield	Washington	$26,954	$51,548	$66,182	2,249	970
656	Aransas	Texas	$26,953	$42,476	$55,880	23,627	9,834
657	Charlevoix	Michigan	$26,947	$45,949	$56,236	26,030	10,667
658	Campbell	Kentucky	$26,945	$54,306	$69,837	90,606	35,203
659	Manassas Park City	Virginia	$26,944	$71,227	$74,552	15,125	4,435
660	King William	Virginia	$26,940	$62,670	$68,397	15,959	5,998
661	Fremont	Iowa	$26,930	$50,520	$61,389	7,291	2,965
Kansas			$26,929	$51,332	$65,069	2,868,107	1,110,440
662	Kittson	Minnesota	$26,927	$48,875	$64,310	4,528	1,912
663	Sandoval	New Mexico	$26,924	$58,017	$65,768	133,503	47,164
664	Calhoun	Illinois	$26,924	$50,436	$61,464	5,062	2,061
665	Cleveland	Oklahoma	$26,920	$54,989	$69,531	261,047	96,701
666	Mitchell	Kansas	$26,911	$46,667	$61,486	6,368	2,804
667	Sussex	Delaware	$26,908	$52,710	$61,308	200,632	76,444
668	Jefferson	Louisiana	$26,908	$48,261	$61,131	433,477	167,251
669	Jefferson	Alabama	$26,906	$45,429	$59,095	658,552	259,634
670	Thomas	Kansas	$26,903	$48,187	$71,777	7,902	3,120
Nebraska			$26,899	$51,672	$65,328	1,841,625	725,787
671	Rankin	Mississippi	$26,897	$57,380	$67,674	143,665	53,223
672	Rawlins	Kansas	$26,897	$43,482	$55,551	2,545	1,224
673	Boone	Missouri	$26,895	$48,627	$70,096	165,776	65,649
674	Lexington	South Carolina	$26,886	$54,061	$66,099	266,575	103,742
675	Kandiyohi	Minnesota	$26,880	$50,149	$62,904	42,265	17,120
676	Hays	Texas	$26,873	$58,651	$75,729	164,144	56,459
677	Santa Rosa	Florida	$26,861	$57,703	$66,006	155,579	57,368
678	Phelps	Nebraska	$26,856	$50,000	$65,884	9,186	3,808
679	Stark	Illinois	$26,843	$54,203	$62,993	5,942	2,416
680	Sheridan	Kansas	$26,841	$48,674	$57,244	2,553	1,099
681	Brunswick	North Carolina	$26,839	$46,438	$54,220	110,324	47,600
682	Marshall	Minnesota	$26,834	$52,198	$65,057	9,454	4,080
683	Carson	Texas	$26,827	$65,026	$73,125	6,158	2,337
684	McLeod	Minnesota	$26,824	$55,170	$67,968	36,321	14,716
Maine			$26,824	$48,453	$61,107	1,328,320	553,823
685	Armstrong	Texas	$26,823	$61,635	$76,357	1,773	647
686	Dallas	Texas	$26,816	$49,481	$55,113	2,412,481	858,332
687	Bernalillo	New Mexico	$26,814	$48,801	$60,740	667,092	263,135
688	Butler	Ohio	$26,813	$56,610	$69,799	369,650	134,612
689	Smith	Kansas	$26,811	$45,556	$51,914	3,790	1,726
Oregon			$26,809	$50,229	$61,609	3,868,721	1,516,456
690	Niobrara	Wyoming	$26,797	$38,438	$57,024	2,495	1,045
691	Blanco	Texas	$26,781	$49,487	$68,598	10,562	4,036
692	Howard	Nebraska	$26,770	$49,088	$65,039	6,308	2,576
693	Lincoln	Minnesota	$26,767	$47,861	$63,201	5,854	2,485
694	Baldwin	Alabama	$26,766	$50,221	$60,864	187,114	73,283
695	Jones	Iowa	$26,762	$55,041	$64,955	20,637	8,063
696	Coweta	Georgia	$26,757	$60,813	$70,163	129,397	46,912
697	St. Charles	Louisiana	$26,756	$58,758	$66,392	52,627	18,547
698	Macomb	Michigan	$26,748	$53,451	$66,612	845,197	332,818
699	Humboldt	Iowa	$26,746	$47,897	$62,143	9,776	4,222
700	Sacramento	California	$26,739	$55,064	$64,154	1,435,207	517,243
701	Benton	Oregon	$26,738	$48,604	$75,012	85,989	33,384
702	Glynn	Georgia	$26,724	$46,407	$56,221	80,280	31,547
703	Berks	Pennsylvania	$26,723	$55,170	$67,138	412,078	153,897
704	Licking	Ohio	$26,716	$55,114	$67,072	167,065	64,009
705	Hamilton	Nebraska	$26,715	$56,065	$61,786	9,090	3,488
706	Benton	Arkansas	$26,715	$54,515	$61,706	227,439	82,150
707	Garden	Nebraska	$26,715	$39,400	$52,083	1,966	836
708	Bureau	Illinois	$26,705	$48,977	$60,525	34,594	13,998
709	DeWitt	Illinois	$26,704	$51,051	$64,446	16,511	6,802
710	Mesa	Colorado	$26,700	$49,471	$60,534	147,432	58,598
711	Pickens	Georgia	$26,686	$51,383	$59,623	29,486	11,083
712	Nicollet	Minnesota	$26,674	$60,115	$71,741	32,849	12,192
713	Spencer	Kentucky	$26,666	$65,209	$69,980	17,303	6,230
714	Grant	Minnesota	$26,665	$50,030	$61,455	5,990	2,580
715	Salem City	Virginia	$26,661	$48,733	$60,742	24,950	9,908
716	Kauaʻi	Hawaii	$26,658	$62,052	$73,205	67,872	22,390
717	Greenville	South Carolina	$26,643	$49,022	$61,768	459,857	175,149
718	Ogle	Illinois	$26,635	$54,541	$69,172	53,092	20,745
719	Reagan	Texas	$26,633	$61,250	$65,600	3,441	1,178
720	Iowa County	Wisconsin	$26,625	$55,659	$70,079	23,709	9,610
721	Benton	Iowa	$26,624	$56,669	$69,676	25,971	10,079
722	Mercer	Illinois	$26,620	$53,136	$63,831	16,325	6,716
723	Ottawa	Kansas	$26,614	$58,396	$66,085	6,078	2,408
724	Garfield	Colorado	$26,603	$57,022	$66,941	56,687	20,163
725	Jerauld	South Dakota	$26,590	$46,591	$54,300	2,055	882
Nevada			$26,589	$52,800	$61,359	2,730,066	999,016
726	Schoharie	New York	$26,584	$53,245	$65,610	32,404	12,820
727	Eaton	Michigan	$26,582	$54,115	$65,740	107,920	43,362
728	Essex	New York	$26,582	$47,380	$60,935	39,181	15,919
729	Clay	Florida	$26,577	$59,482	$68,078	192,665	67,805
730	Brown	Minnesota	$26,576	$48,256	$65,804	25,643	10,820
731	Cedar	Iowa	$26,567	$58,088	$66,176	18,452	7,665
732	Oklahoma County	Oklahoma	$26,561	$45,215	$58,240	732,118	285,320
733	York	South Carolina	$26,553	$53,740	$66,256	230,934	86,483
734	Hot Springs	Wyoming	$26,544	$42,019	$56,344	4,825	2,238
735	Forsyth	North Carolina	$26,541	$45,724	$59,764	354,656	140,439
736	Aleutians East	Alaska	$26,535	$61,250	$67,750	3,141	435
737	Washington County	Maryland	$26,532	$55,609	$66,435	148,435	55,960
738	Whatcom	Washington	$26,530	$51,939	$68,159	203,211	79,314
739	Crow Wing	Minnesota	$26,527	$47,058	$57,958	62,742	26,963
740	Panola	Texas	$26,525	$52,453	$61,317	23,877	8,873
741	Humboldt	Nevada	$26,515	$59,472	$74,433	16,800	6,314
742	Kenosha	Wisconsin	$26,514	$54,930	$68,255	166,874	62,560
743	McCook	South Dakota	$26,505	$52,703	$66,106	5,605	2,186
744	Orleans	Louisiana	$26,500	$37,146	$46,512	357,013	148,398
745	Lancaster	Pennsylvania	$26,496	$56,483	$67,646	523,306	194,082
746	Queens	New York	$26,495	$57,001	$64,371	2,256,400	778,630
747	Martin	Minnesota	$26,472	$48,530	$61,233	20,634	8,797
748	Iredell	North Carolina	$26,467	$50,329	$60,413	161,297	59,468
749	Guilford	North Carolina	$26,461	$45,431	$58,551	495,326	196,463
750	Washington County	Iowa	$26,459	$54,554	$66,967	21,834	8,948
751	Rock Island	Illinois	$26,455	$48,702	$62,123	147,477	60,456
752	Houston	Minnesota	$26,450	$52,545	$65,646	18,915	7,809
753	Coke	Texas	$26,407	$40,795	$60,684	3,271	1,436
754	Otter Tail	Minnesota	$26,400	$48,961	$61,645	57,369	24,356
755	Dorchester	Maryland	$26,388	$46,361	$57,893	32,617	13,386
756	Shelby	Iowa	$26,387	$48,783	$62,273	12,088	5,083
757	Minnehaha	South Dakota	$26,380	$52,345	$66,555	173,108	67,623
758	Highland County	Virginia	$26,372	$49,625	$56,625	2,276	1,006
759	Grant	Kansas	$26,370	$53,213	$59,306	7,869	2,793
760	Fond du Lac	Wisconsin	$26,368	$53,820	$65,103	101,666	41,267
761	Lee	Georgia	$26,357	$60,104	$67,319	28,631	9,773
762	Sac	Iowa	$26,350	$48,093	$61,942	10,227	4,435
763	Lamar	Mississippi	$26,345	$51,154	$62,945	56,763	21,678
764	Douglas	Kansas	$26,342	$49,508	$70,955	112,210	43,398
765	Platte	Wyoming	$26,335	$45,512	$62,596	8,701	3,642
766	Kerr	Texas	$26,334	$43,601	$55,152	49,696	20,357
767	Cherokee	Iowa	$26,330	$48,977	$61,634	12,013	5,354
768	Wood	Ohio	$26,326	$52,069	$69,704	127,325	49,086
769	Washington County	Illinois	$26,325	$52,832	$64,959	14,626	5,882
770	Putnam	Georgia	$26,321	$44,764	$51,380	21,241	8,457
771	Davie	North Carolina	$26,319	$50,139	$58,530	41,339	16,234
772	Osborne	Kansas	$26,313	$37,925	$49,073	3,846	1,727
773	Providence	Rhode Island	$26,308	$49,297	$62,348	627,469	237,800
774	Charlotte	Florida	$26,286	$44,378	$53,586	161,276	70,545
775	Jefferson	Kansas	$26,280	$56,875	$67,439	18,971	7,421
776	Granite	Montana	$26,277	$45,236	$57,891	3,105	1,473
777	Morgan	Utah	$26,274	$80,337	$87,922	9,692	2,860
778	Scott	Kansas	$26,274	$50,605	$55,938	4,930	2,121
779	Columbia	Oregon	$26,271	$54,968	$63,435	49,333	19,069
780	La Crosse	Wisconsin	$26,271	$51,339	$69,606	115,420	45,949
781	Berkeley	West Virginia	$26,264	$53,515	$61,575	105,812	40,447
782	Carson City	Nevada	$26,264	$51,957	$63,883	54,821	21,186
783	Delaware County	Iowa	$26,261	$54,076	$68,096	17,665	7,129
784	Beaver	Pennsylvania	$26,258	$49,217	$62,792	170,382	70,867
785	Dubuque	Iowa	$26,254	$51,475	$66,046	94,411	37,366
786	Vilas	Wisconsin	$26,252	$40,833	$50,051	21,401	10,636
787	Franklin	Kentucky	$26,243	$46,071	$58,556	49,390	21,058
Florida			$26,236	$46,956	$56,738	19,091,156	7,158,980
788	St. Clair	Illinois	$26,234	$50,578	$63,373	268,939	102,885
789	Gove	Kansas	$26,233	$44,866	$51,939	2,835	1,201
790	Macon	Illinois	$26,232	$46,559	$59,733	110,262	45,142
791	Barber	Kansas	$26,229	$45,920	$56,048	4,898	2,187
792	Linn	Kansas	$26,224	$45,519	$52,761	9,580	4,234
793	Clark	Nevada	$26,217	$52,873	$60,666	1,976,925	710,058
794	Pratt	Kansas	$26,209	$46,035	$60,000	9,730	4,074
795	Rutland	Vermont	$26,205	$49,271	$61,516	61,270	25,754
796	Greene	Iowa	$26,205	$45,865	$57,150	9,255	3,969
797	Charles City County	Virginia	$26,198	$48,428	$58,893	7,205	2,850
798	Leon	Florida	$26,196	$46,369	$68,516	278,624	110,377
799	Hyde	South Dakota	$26,195	$47,813	$67,292	1,387	549
800	Lincoln	Nebraska	$26,188	$48,158	$62,464	36,128	15,067
801	Worth	Iowa	$26,187	$50,476	$60,159	7,562	3,197
802	Guadalupe	Texas	$26,184	$61,958	$71,325	135,940	46,409
803	Harrison	Iowa	$26,184	$54,583	$67,468	14,729	5,996
804	Potter	South Dakota	$26,180	$44,556	$53,750	2,323	1,051
805	Cole	Missouri	$26,160	$53,931	$66,712	76,228	29,302
806	Buncombe	North Carolina	$26,159	$44,713	$56,616	241,801	100,838
807	Duval	Florida	$26,143	$48,323	$59,238	872,598	330,897
808	Hancock	Ohio	$26,139	$49,589	$64,032	75,239	30,610
809	Ransom	North Dakota	$26,137	$49,788	$66,076	5,472	2,283
810	Erie	Ohio	$26,135	$46,498	$60,856	76,634	31,972
811	Ohio County	West Virginia	$26,135	$41,025	$57,865	44,156	18,553
812	Sheboygan	Wisconsin	$26,126	$52,920	$65,968	115,235	46,312
813	Dawson	Montana	$26,126	$50,405	$63,551	9,132	3,885
814	Golden Valley	North Dakota	$26,113	$36,100	$64,821	1,698	754
815	Hutchinson	South Dakota	$26,110	$42,451	$59,403	7,239	2,937
816	Beaver	Oklahoma	$26,109	$51,422	$60,483	5,605	2,108
817	Salt Lake	Utah	$26,103	$60,555	$70,215	1,048,314	344,089
818	Franklin	Iowa	$26,102	$48,355	$54,625	10,623	4,358
819	Franklin	Nebraska	$26,095	$43,011	$56,875	3,181	1,398
820	Stearns	Minnesota	$26,065	$54,551	$69,196	151,053	56,737
821	Renville	Minnesota	$26,062	$50,802	$58,599	15,499	6,400
822	Jackson	Missouri	$26,062	$47,015	$60,580	675,641	271,545
823	Winchester City	Virginia	$26,060	$44,200	$56,967	26,587	10,393
824	Nelson	Virginia	$26,059	$48,789	$59,191	14,940	6,404
825	Shawnee	Kansas	$26,057	$48,451	$63,230	178,378	72,584
826	Perry	Pennsylvania	$26,048	$57,375	$66,005	45,808	18,173
Ohio			$26,046	$48,308	$61,371	11,549,590	4,557,655
827	Koochiching	Minnesota	$26,045	$41,108	$56,065	13,251	6,134
828	Davis	Utah	$26,035	$69,707	$76,888	311,886	95,238
829	Lorain	Ohio	$26,030	$51,816	$63,212	301,720	116,705
830	Lyon	Minnesota	$26,028	$49,594	$70,016	25,703	10,083
831	Hand	South Dakota	$26,027	$47,679	$59,671	3,433	1,429
832	Woods	Oklahoma	$26,022	$51,619	$65,064	8,849	3,439
Texas			$26,019	$51,900	$61,066	25,639,373	8,886,471
833	Big Stone	Minnesota	$26,019	$46,313	$56,012	5,209	2,347
834	Chippewa	Minnesota	$25,993	$49,434	$64,608	12,272	5,093
835	Niagara	New York	$25,991	$47,955	$63,523	215,465	88,376
836	Sauk	Wisconsin	$25,988	$52,140	$65,561	62,353	25,206
837	Story	Iowa	$25,986	$50,516	$76,860	90,750	35,196
838	Marshall	Illinois	$25,975	$51,504	$62,827	12,454	5,021
839	Clinton	Iowa	$25,966	$49,559	$63,452	48,896	20,008
840	Saline	Arkansas	$25,962	$55,348	$66,936	109,844	41,287
841	Wood	Wisconsin	$25,961	$47,685	$60,258	74,469	32,037
842	McCracken	Kentucky	$25,957	$44,898	$57,709	65,610	27,037
843	Waupaca	Wisconsin	$25,956	$50,822	$61,581	52,300	21,388
844	Carbon	Wyoming	$25,947	$55,347	$65,402	15,809	6,077
845	St. Louis County	Minnesota	$25,946	$46,517	$63,168	200,327	85,238
846	Tuolumne	California	$25,943	$48,426	$59,152	54,728	22,025
847	Oconto	Wisconsin	$25,941	$51,615	$62,599	37,531	15,701
848	Monroe	Michigan	$25,939	$53,972	$65,363	151,408	58,702
849	Jackson	Colorado	$25,936	$43,606	$60,714	1,371	648
850	Morgan	Georgia	$25,933	$47,729	$55,030	17,870	6,513
851	Gwinnett	Georgia	$25,932	$60,445	$66,432	825,911	266,952
852	Garfield	Montana	$25,921	$45,096	$59,423	1,145	465
853	Walworth	South Dakota	$25,915	$41,826	$59,449	5,477	2,342
854	San Benito	California	$25,914	$66,237	$71,425	56,115	16,995
855	Henderson	Illinois	$25,902	$49,389	$60,066	7,186	3,202
856	Wheeler	Nebraska	$25,898	$38,807	$53,015	869	379
857	Chelan	Washington	$25,893	$51,354	$61,230	73,047	27,220
858	Kent	Michigan	$25,889	$51,667	$63,176	609,544	229,373
859	Boone	Illinois	$25,888	$60,893	$67,049	54,068	17,938
860	Austin	Texas	$25,884	$53,265	$64,760	28,573	10,615
861	Ida	Iowa	$25,869	$43,449	$58,470	7,099	3,182
862	Clay	Texas	$25,867	$53,776	$66,788	10,651	4,216
863	Clallam	Washington	$25,865	$46,033	$59,169	71,731	30,814
864	Otoe	Nebraska	$25,855	$50,881	$63,841	15,727	6,438
865	Currituck	North Carolina	$25,854	$57,159	$66,626	23,880	9,121
866	Pottawattamie	Iowa	$25,847	$51,304	$63,669	92,962	36,460
867	Monongalia	West Virginia	$25,846	$44,173	$68,101	98,483	36,449
868	Walton	Florida	$25,845	$43,640	$56,484	56,590	22,639
869	Lincoln	Wyoming	$25,834	$64,205	$71,523	18,100	6,245
870	Brown	Indiana	$25,833	$51,568	$59,221	15,128	5,889
871	Wright	Iowa	$25,827	$45,205	$59,070	13,092	5,367
872	Manitowoc	Wisconsin	$25,825	$48,881	$63,889	81,098	34,067
873	Sanborn	South Dakota	$25,823	$48,384	$62,583	2,348	1,051
874	Hampden	Massachusetts	$25,817	$49,094	$61,474	465,144	177,990
875	Lincoln	Washington	$25,816	$47,195	$60,478	10,481	4,457
876	Hancock	Iowa	$25,814	$50,105	$60,921	11,243	4,648
877	Banner	Nebraska	$25,814	$36,875	$51,750	816	330
878	Barton	Kansas	$25,800	$44,981	$56,250	27,602	11,491
879	Polk	Minnesota	$25,790	$50,695	$64,911	31,522	12,663
880	Flathead	Montana	$25,790	$46,581	$56,284	91,536	36,901
881	Sibley	Minnesota	$25,789	$54,017	$64,750	15,146	6,090
882	Valley	Idaho	$25,785	$50,473	$60,100	9,698	3,519
883	Morgan	Indiana	$25,781	$55,354	$63,148	69,217	25,621
884	Wasatch	Utah	$25,777	$65,050	$70,303	24,542	7,602
885	Edmunds	South Dakota	$25,775	$49,831	$65,179	4,051	1,589
886	Kingfisher	Oklahoma	$25,773	$54,666	$61,528	15,069	5,733
887	Kennebec	Maine	$25,770	$46,808	$59,915	121,757	51,719
888	Calhoun	Iowa	$25,766	$44,484	$55,234	9,952	4,356
889	Missoula	Montana	$25,764	$46,117	$62,988	110,243	45,523
890	Richland	South Carolina	$25,763	$48,359	$62,935	389,708	143,874
891	Custer	Colorado	$25,761	$32,427	$50,000	4,245	2,048
892	Kalamazoo	Michigan	$25,757	$45,775	$62,159	252,763	100,072
893	Haakon	South Dakota	$25,754	$47,198	$64,120	1,944	807
894	Polk	Wisconsin	$25,751	$48,538	$58,842	43,905	18,266
895	Perkins	South Dakota	$25,751	$38,362	$56,429	2,943	1,364
896	Swift	Minnesota	$25,750	$48,026	$64,250	9,678	4,315
897	Plaquemines	Louisiana	$25,748	$55,138	$66,800	23,385	8,615
898	Franklin	Pennsylvania	$25,741	$52,637	$63,117	150,594	58,273
South Dakota			$25,740	$49,495	$63,195	825,198	323,136
899	Cedar	Nebraska	$25,738	$48,038	$58,542	8,790	3,529
—	Saint John	U.S. Virgin Islands	$25,730	$40,644	$50,592	4,170	1,894
900	Waseca	Minnesota	$25,723	$53,657	$66,173	19,046	7,328
901	Caroline	Virginia	$25,718	$57,218	$64,258	28,757	10,680
902	Champaign	Illinois	$25,713	$45,808	$69,554	202,428	79,137
903	LaSalle	Illinois	$25,709	$52,640	$64,693	113,295	44,257
904	Greene	New York	$25,700	$49,655	$60,571	48,928	18,365
905	Harding	New Mexico	$25,686	$34,063	$49,167	687	261
906	Valley	Montana	$25,685	$47,181	$58,668	7,465	3,248
Michigan			$25,681	$48,411	$60,793	9,886,095	3,823,280
907	Clatsop	Oregon	$25,680	$44,683	$54,849	37,157	15,749
908	Henderson	North Carolina	$25,670	$44,815	$57,062	107,583	45,246
909	Freeborn	Minnesota	$25,668	$44,683	$58,220	31,129	13,230
910	Meeker	Minnesota	$25,665	$53,904	$63,881	23,197	9,288
911	Wise	Texas	$25,663	$56,005	$63,661	59,894	20,487
912	Ellis	Texas	$25,662	$61,952	$69,685	152,020	51,016
913	Spokane	Washington	$25,661	$49,233	$62,589	473,832	187,572
914	Roseau	Minnesota	$25,650	$50,759	$59,226	15,587	6,402
915	Redwood	Minnesota	$25,649	$47,447	$60,685	15,942	6,507
Missouri			$25,649	$47,380	$59,527	6,007,182	2,360,131
916	Rockbridge	Virginia	$25,638	$48,313	$59,165	22,345	9,234
917	Jessamine	Kentucky	$25,637	$49,024	$58,733	49,112	18,012
918	Watonwan	Minnesota	$25,635	$49,698	$61,064	11,173	4,445
919	Smith	Texas	$25,626	$47,432	$60,259	212,227	78,459
920	Jefferson	Wisconsin	$25,625	$53,454	$67,058	83,985	32,137
921	Camden	North Carolina	$25,620	$56,607	$70,025	10,037	3,580
922	Logan	Oklahoma	$25,620	$53,591	$66,917	42,871	14,927
923	Sedgwick	Kansas	$25,603	$49,865	$63,042	500,768	192,651
924	Newton	Indiana	$25,594	$50,262	$57,870	14,151	5,374
925	Lackawanna	Pennsylvania	$25,594	$46,044	$59,573	214,275	85,769
926	Boone	Nebraska	$25,590	$45,246	$59,278	5,441	2,242
927	Dubois	Indiana	$25,589	$54,780	$66,988	42,103	15,890
928	Codington	South Dakota	$25,582	$47,214	$63,037	27,439	11,566
929	Adams	Nebraska	$25,571	$49,440	$65,286	31,367	12,578
930	Adair	Iowa	$25,564	$47,892	$60,232	7,588	3,295
931	Hardin	Texas	$25,559	$53,013	$64,383	54,945	20,633
932	Pocahontas	Iowa	$25,556	$44,073	$56,607	7,243	3,227
933	Lincoln	North Carolina	$25,550	$48,940	$60,059	78,761	29,994
934	Shelby	Tennessee	$25,549	$46,250	$57,213	932,919	343,517
935	Centre	Pennsylvania	$25,545	$50,336	$70,654	154,460	57,197
936	Gray	Kansas	$25,537	$57,808	$63,875	6,012	2,066
937	Republic	Kansas	$25,531	$39,572	$52,944	4,919	2,274
938	Alpine	California	$25,527	$58,636	$76,645	1,165	394
939	Trigg	Kentucky	$25,527	$45,629	$53,893	14,289	5,935
940	Liberty	Montana	$25,522	$44,493	$58,438	2,357	847
941	Augusta	Virginia	$25,519	$52,027	$60,614	73,726	27,999
942	Uinta	Wyoming	$25,513	$58,515	$73,060	21,040	7,290
943	Monroe	Pennsylvania	$25,494	$57,408	$65,433	168,947	58,875
70%	70th Percentile		$25,490				
944	Isanti	Minnesota	$25,482	$57,353	$68,053	38,078	13,860
945	Putnam	Ohio	$25,481	$61,192	$72,075	34,339	13,022
946	Marion	Iowa	$25,477	$54,723	$69,241	33,318	12,691
947	Weld	Colorado	$25,468	$57,180	$66,840	258,780	90,465
948	Jersey	Illinois	$25,467	$53,954	$63,789	22,850	8,752
949	Fillmore	Nebraska	$25,460	$48,464	$60,897	5,818	2,444
950	Becker	Minnesota	$25,455	$50,214	$59,844	32,800	13,476
951	Lincoln	New Mexico	$25,449	$43,014	$49,213	20,359	8,685
952	Ford	Illinois	$25,448	$48,866	$60,799	13,991	5,651
953	Cass	Iowa	$25,448	$43,481	$52,403	13,793	6,081
954	Ohio County	Indiana	$25,443	$50,377	$59,539	6,075	2,422
955	Shackelford	Texas	$25,436	$47,277	$56,875	3,362	1,445
956	Carroll	Iowa	$25,430	$48,361	$64,495	20,732	8,626
957	Wallace	Kansas	$25,429	$47,454	$59,038	1,568	611
958	McIntosh	North Dakota	$25,427	$36,066	$50,887	2,791	1,308
959	Pawnee	Nebraska	$25,426	$37,321	$49,191	2,759	1,314
960	Lee	Illinois	$25,409	$50,060	$62,194	35,535	13,504
961	Turner	South Dakota	$25,406	$51,925	$62,026	8,344	3,461
962	Genesee	New York	$25,403	$49,922	$62,864	59,872	23,884
963	Clark	Kansas	$25,385	$41,129	$52,083	2,188	932
964	Blue Earth	Minnesota	$25,380	$49,935	$68,864	64,504	24,476
965	Wicomico	Maryland	$25,378	$51,092	$59,379	99,683	36,405
966	Bayfield	Wisconsin	$25,377	$44,944	$55,654	15,071	6,964
967	Meade	South Dakota	$25,375	$49,324	$58,193	25,914	10,083
968	White	Illinois	$25,375	$42,914	$56,110	14,630	6,240
Montana			$25,373	$46,230	$59,743	998,554	405,525
969	Ottawa	Michigan	$25,371	$56,453	$67,166	267,017	94,666
970	Steuben	New York	$25,371	$47,476	$56,903	98,951	41,503
971	Rice	Minnesota	$25,370	$59,915	$72,133	64,585	22,299
972	Miami	Ohio	$25,369	$52,040	$61,644	102,867	41,239
973	Decatur	Tennessee	$25,368	$36,258	$46,973	11,695	5,066
974	Bandera	Texas	$25,364	$49,215	$63,387	20,533	8,405
Arizona			$25,358	$49,774	$58,897	6,479,703	2,370,289
975	Washington County	Tennessee	$25,355	$42,075	$52,949	123,891	51,771
976	McPherson	Nebraska	$25,339	$54,926	$57,981	382	169
977	Portage	Ohio	$25,332	$52,697	$66,446	163,387	60,992
978	Chemung	New York	$25,329	$48,804	$60,715	88,876	35,622
979	Logan	Kansas	$25,328	$41,765	$59,412	2,775	1,282
980	Wayne	New York	$25,327	$52,601	$62,677	93,224	36,399
981	Auglaize	Ohio	$25,323	$52,239	$62,940	45,906	18,241
982	Harlan	Nebraska	$25,322	$45,920	$55,400	3,445	1,573
983	Gilliam	Oregon	$25,320	$44,743	$56,667	1,915	883
984	Poweshiek	Iowa	$25,318	$50,349	$66,827	18,804	7,488
985	Tama	Iowa	$25,311	$51,670	$60,657	17,661	6,794
986	Newport News City	Virginia	$25,310	$51,027	$59,514	181,025	69,211
987	Yellow Medicine	Minnesota	$25,303	$52,510	$61,389	10,294	4,135
988	Andrew	Missouri	$25,302	$54,336	$67,006	17,319	6,691
989	Henry	Georgia	$25,299	$60,781	$67,683	206,349	69,238
990	McClain	Oklahoma	$25,293	$54,426	$67,537	35,155	12,749
991	Kings	New York	$25,289	$46,085	$51,581	2,539,789	916,025
992	Eau Claire	Wisconsin	$25,287	$48,090	$67,630	99,788	39,754
993	Cass	Minnesota	$25,287	$45,045	$53,277	28,485	12,906
North Carolina			$25,284	$46,334	$56,928	9,651,380	3,715,565
994	Kewaunee	Wisconsin	$25,282	$53,588	$67,033	20,578	8,145
995	Allen	Indiana	$25,279	$49,370	$60,867	358,324	138,212
996	Green Lake	Wisconsin	$25,275	$46,994	$60,358	19,042	8,001
997	Butler	Iowa	$25,269	$52,026	$63,153	14,909	6,189
998	Pima	Arizona	$25,269	$45,841	$57,757	986,891	384,041
999	Nemaha	Nebraska	$25,269	$42,672	$68,516	7,207	3,001
1000	Frontier	Nebraska	$25,262	$50,227	$58,636	2,568	1,086
1001	Marshall	Kansas	$25,262	$44,032	$60,625	10,057	4,345
1002	Keya Paha	Nebraska	$25,251	$36,923	$44,231	698	354
1003	Fillmore	Minnesota	$25,249	$50,657	$64,379	20,870	8,422
1004	Cabarrus	North Carolina	$25,247	$53,551	$66,058	181,415	64,713
1005	Hampton City	Virginia	$25,247	$50,705	$62,991	136,957	52,511
1006	Westmoreland	Virginia	$25,245	$49,157	$55,966	17,532	7,130
1007	Hamlin	South Dakota	$25,233	$55,563	$63,659	5,925	2,041
1008	Madison	New York	$25,230	$53,589	$66,688	72,839	26,565
1009	Crawford	Illinois	$25,214	$46,216	$59,235	19,707	7,731
1010	Knox	Nebraska	$25,214	$42,230	$54,286	8,617	3,776
1011	Cherry	Nebraska	$25,213	$45,464	$54,185	5,735	2,618
1012	Caroline	Maryland	$25,211	$58,632	$66,471	32,871	11,806
1013	Burt	Nebraska	$25,203	$46,817	$62,449	6,748	2,899
1014	Houston	Georgia	$25,195	$54,893	$66,233	143,205	52,330
1015	Lincoln	Oregon	$25,194	$42,365	$53,750	46,070	20,913
1016	Cooke	Texas	$25,186	$50,067	$59,160	38,484	14,466
1017	Antelope	Nebraska	$25,186	$43,518	$54,688	6,600	2,855
1018	Yavapai	Arizona	$25,186	$42,987	$53,015	211,968	91,349
Georgia			$25,182	$49,179	$58,755	9,810,417	3,518,097
1019	Hood River	Oregon	$25,181	$56,725	$64,422	22,427	8,144
1020	DeSoto	Mississippi	$25,176	$58,505	$64,822	163,975	57,979
1021	Hardin	Iowa	$25,153	$49,342	$64,360	17,453	7,061
1022	Wilkin	Minnesota	$25,148	$50,507	$62,835	6,576	2,685
1023	Christian	Missouri	$25,134	$52,838	$60,493	78,724	29,652
1024	Shenandoah	Virginia	$25,134	$49,625	$57,422	42,270	17,397
1025	Douglas	Wisconsin	$25,129	$45,418	$59,716	43,994	18,933
1026	Lee	Texas	$25,123	$51,534	$66,352	16,603	6,078
1027	Big Horn	Wyoming	$25,119	$52,589	$61,910	11,741	4,462
1028	Haskell	Kansas	$25,114	$52,415	$60,125	4,219	1,411
1029	Washington County	Virginia	$25,109	$41,897	$54,606	54,804	22,755
1030	Oneida	New York	$25,103	$48,729	$62,090	234,206	91,075
1031	Clinton	Missouri	$25,100	$53,826	$64,341	20,659	8,089
1032	Amelia	Virginia	$25,100	$52,885	$61,403	12,712	4,808
1033	Iroquois	Illinois	$25,098	$47,079	$58,930	29,446	11,892
1034	Keith	Nebraska	$25,097	$41,970	$58,047	8,247	3,786
1035	Tipton	Indiana	$25,093	$52,686	$60,757	15,834	6,622
1036	Chatham	Georgia	$25,093	$45,794	$55,978	271,102	102,484
1037	Rutherford	Tennessee	$25,077	$55,401	$66,755	269,407	96,731
1038	Livingston	Louisiana	$25,076	$56,811	$66,164	130,192	46,246
1039	Clayton	Iowa	$25,074	$47,494	$57,348	17,990	7,707
1040	Faribault	Minnesota	$25,065	$44,264	$56,849	14,430	6,331
1041	Winneshiek	Iowa	$25,062	$53,122	$66,694	21,038	8,042
1042	Barry	Michigan	$25,059	$52,186	$63,064	59,121	22,610
1043	Palo Alto	Iowa	$25,055	$44,663	$60,550	9,352	3,948
1044	Box Butte	Nebraska	$25,046	$46,373	$58,521	11,312	4,860
1045	Muscatine	Iowa	$25,038	$51,425	$60,616	42,798	16,410
1046	Lake	Colorado	$25,029	$44,610	$57,267	7,332	3,079
1047	Limestone	Alabama	$25,020	$48,619	$57,858	85,264	31,794
1048	Trempealeau	Wisconsin	$25,017	$49,143	$61,196	29,098	11,745
1049	Burnet	Texas	$24,998	$48,115	$58,125	43,230	16,588
1050	Montgomery	Ohio	$24,997	$43,401	$55,971	536,433	222,578
1051	Sierra	California	$24,996	$39,009	$52,454	3,127	1,253
1052	Mower	Minnesota	$24,990	$46,004	$61,094	39,252	15,855
1053	Washington County	Colorado	$24,977	$44,683	$55,606	4,796	2,019
1054	Montgomery	Alabama	$24,975	$44,790	$56,684	228,980	88,844
1055	Portage	Wisconsin	$24,972	$50,996	$65,214	70,136	27,975
1056	Sullivan	New York	$24,963	$48,089	$60,166	77,134	29,531
1057	Kaufman	Texas	$24,954	$61,194	$67,995	105,220	34,922
1058	Livingston	Illinois	$24,952	$54,614	$64,978	38,687	14,446
1059	Stevens	Kansas	$24,950	$54,494	$63,438	5,713	1,936
1060	Aitkin	Minnesota	$24,939	$41,617	$50,684	16,032	7,741
1061	Saline	Kansas	$24,935	$47,215	$55,970	55,633	22,173
1062	Garrett	Maryland	$24,932	$45,206	$56,341	30,014	11,974
1063	St. James	Louisiana	$24,930	$55,443	$63,632	21,916	7,786
1064	Allamakee	Iowa	$24,926	$48,831	$56,269	14,242	5,862
1065	Woodward	Oklahoma	$24,922	$51,867	$63,096	20,483	7,382
1066	Carter	Montana	$24,921	$39,659	$60,000	1,241	495
1067	Jasper	Iowa	$24,905	$50,513	$63,418	36,710	14,826
1068	Pottawatomie	Kansas	$24,892	$56,854	$71,259	22,009	7,974
1069	Kosciusko	Indiana	$24,881	$50,859	$60,725	77,527	29,705
1070	Hubbard	Minnesota	$24,880	$45,961	$55,744	20,440	8,670
1071	De Baca	New Mexico	$24,879	$37,660	$46,534	1,975	689
1072	Orange	Florida	$24,877	$47,581	$56,830	1,175,416	415,790
1073	Wagoner	Oklahoma	$24,874	$55,723	$63,730	74,077	27,016
1074	Carbon	Pennsylvania	$24,861	$48,900	$57,049	65,074	25,903
1075	Dewey	Oklahoma	$24,860	$46,488	$57,868	4,800	1,830
1076	Alachua	Florida	$24,857	$42,149	$62,139	249,848	96,043
1077	Kent	Delaware	$24,851	$55,149	$64,414	165,030	58,524
1078	Washburn	Wisconsin	$24,850	$41,924	$52,635	15,842	7,348
1079	Kent	Texas	$24,839	$46,875	$56,016	913	401
1080	West Baton Rouge	Louisiana	$24,838	$50,926	$64,567	24,012	8,820
1081	Sherman	Nebraska	$24,837	$41,835	$51,469	3,129	1,369
1082	Broome	New York	$24,835	$45,958	$59,345	199,298	79,763
1083	Benzie	Michigan	$24,831	$47,366	$54,971	17,474	7,682
1084	Pierce	Nebraska	$24,830	$51,924	$62,143	7,211	2,916
1085	Buffalo	Nebraska	$24,830	$50,963	$67,076	46,885	17,705
1086	Effingham	Georgia	$24,824	$63,030	$69,450	52,961	17,830
1087	Johnson	Texas	$24,816	$57,535	$65,392	152,384	52,044
1088	Keweenaw	Michigan	$24,802	$39,038	$50,250	2,181	1,014
1089	Lafourche	Louisiana	$24,798	$50,572	$59,941	96,755	35,072
1090	Luzerne	Pennsylvania	$24,793	$44,402	$58,150	320,827	130,880
1091	Jefferson	Missouri	$24,792	$54,845	$64,116	219,636	80,812
1092	Osage	Kansas	$24,789	$50,205	$62,512	16,260	6,558
1093	Schleicher	Texas	$24,787	$50,648	$70,556	3,316	1,078
1094	Ballard	Kentucky	$24,781	$44,588	$56,414	8,282	3,327
1095	Jefferson	Nebraska	$24,777	$44,843	$57,234	7,563	3,301
1096	Monterey	California	$24,775	$59,168	$63,669	420,569	125,428
1097	Fulton	Ohio	$24,771	$52,856	$63,355	42,601	16,285
1098	Delta	Colorado	$24,771	$42,078	$51,539	30,659	12,671
1099	Aiken	South Carolina	$24,769	$44,509	$56,150	161,710	63,388
1100	Albany	Wyoming	$24,758	$42,774	$67,949	36,745	15,257
1101	Ingham	Michigan	$24,754	$45,321	$62,971	281,531	108,823
1102	Staunton City	Virginia	$24,753	$38,501	$61,671	23,989	10,495
1103	Baltimore City	Maryland	$24,750	$41,385	$50,151	621,445	241,455
1104	Atchison	Missouri	$24,748	$44,426	$54,247	5,605	2,448
1105	Franklin	Missouri	$24,742	$48,857	$60,741	101,569	39,263
1106	Orange	Texas	$24,736	$49,507	$59,926	82,372	31,162
1107	San Jacinto	Texas	$24,733	$46,107	$53,569	26,669	9,425
1108	Cascade	Montana	$24,727	$44,963	$58,565	81,621	33,430
1109	Churchill	Nevada	$24,716	$49,830	$60,951	24,572	9,253
1110	Edwards	Kansas	$24,714	$46,551	$55,114	2,998	1,269
1111	San Juan	Colorado	$24,711	$39,583	$53,194	659	321
1112	Cayuga	New York	$24,702	$51,581	$63,082	79,767	31,311
1113	Victoria	Texas	$24,700	$50,364	$56,062	88,068	32,072
1114	Montague	Texas	$24,699	$44,231	$55,267	19,668	8,038
1115	Warren	Missouri	$24,692	$50,830	$64,196	32,667	12,572
1116	Kootenai	Idaho	$24,685	$49,002	$56,911	140,785	55,679
1117	Russell	Kansas	$24,683	$37,111	$48,132	6,945	3,317
1118	Morris	Kansas	$24,680	$47,445	$57,161	5,869	2,503
1119	Clinton	New York	$24,676	$50,282	$63,665	81,865	31,901
1120	Lincoln	Wisconsin	$24,669	$49,021	$61,366	28,650	12,513
1121	Norfolk City	Virginia	$24,659	$44,747	$51,986	244,090	85,557
1122	Asotin	Washington	$24,659	$43,175	$55,321	21,802	9,058
1123	Macoupin	Illinois	$24,658	$49,590	$60,309	47,462	19,254
1124	Osceola	Iowa	$24,653	$48,659	$63,939	6,335	2,676
1125	Dickey	North Dakota	$24,644	$47,359	$62,298	5,264	2,178
1126	Merrick	Nebraska	$24,639	$50,859	$56,185	7,802	3,316
1127	Hawaii County	Hawaii	$24,635	$51,250	$59,862	187,044	64,909
Indiana			$24,635	$48,248	$59,911	6,514,861	2,481,793
1128	Chippewa	Wisconsin	$24,628	$50,551	$61,420	62,676	24,456
1129	Custer	Nebraska	$24,615	$44,873	$56,136	10,872	4,738
1130	Whitley	Indiana	$24,613	$51,914	$61,149	33,274	13,094
1131	Polk	North Carolina	$24,611	$44,745	$53,909	20,381	8,788
1132	Dickinson	Michigan	$24,611	$44,136	$53,342	26,201	11,432
1133	Park	Montana	$24,611	$42,426	$56,960	15,621	6,445
1134	Davison	South Dakota	$24,597	$48,341	$62,438	19,622	8,471
1135	Madison	Nebraska	$24,593	$46,566	$58,592	34,995	13,867
1136	Floyd	Iowa	$24,590	$43,826	$56,004	16,177	7,007
1137	Dodge	Nebraska	$24,588	$48,626	$57,827	36,675	15,221
1138	Prince of Wales-Hyder Census Area	Alaska	$24,581	$46,071	$53,333	5,672	2,240
1139	Moffat	Colorado	$24,577	$53,231	$68,822	13,447	5,062
1140	Wheeler	Oregon	$24,575	$37,974	$46,875	1,292	625
1141	Dodge	Wisconsin	$24,573	$53,075	$64,923	88,598	33,173
1142	Autauga	Alabama	$24,571	$53,682	$66,349	54,907	20,071
1143	Hartley	Texas	$24,566	$65,750	$75,527	6,076	1,748
1144	Kimball	Nebraska	$24,565	$42,180	$52,276	3,779	1,641
1145	Anderson	Tennessee	$24,561	$43,620	$55,940	75,263	30,548
1146	Franklin County	Virginia	$24,557	$45,624	$55,970	56,195	23,358
1147	Monona	Iowa	$24,557	$42,025	$57,292	9,208	3,981
1148	Gage	Nebraska	$24,555	$47,654	$61,483	22,055	9,133
1149	Grant	South Dakota	$24,554	$48,896	$57,699	7,307	3,159
1150	Pennington	Minnesota	$24,554	$45,633	$61,448	14,008	5,806
1151	Clay	Minnesota	$24,550	$52,410	$68,533	59,638	22,463
1152	Nemaha	Kansas	$24,550	$47,122	$61,696	10,149	4,117
1153	Ray	Missouri	$24,549	$52,698	$63,014	23,290	8,735
1154	Winnebago	Iowa	$24,547	$45,603	$61,599	10,732	4,591
1155	Haywood	North Carolina	$24,536	$41,557	$52,014	58,951	26,608
1156	Carroll	Indiana	$24,531	$50,542	$60,427	20,109	7,995
1157	Boyd	Kentucky	$24,530	$40,379	$53,328	49,314	19,530
1158	Whiteside	Illinois	$24,525	$47,667	$58,305	58,150	23,370
1159	Clark	Kentucky	$24,524	$45,853	$57,583	35,608	14,498
1160	Mitchell	Iowa	$24,518	$51,078	$66,895	10,739	4,389
1161	Hamilton	Iowa	$24,510	$43,589	$58,135	15,486	6,395
1162	Hamilton	Kansas	$24,510	$43,357	$51,953	2,645	1,076
1163	Monroe	Iowa	$24,508	$45,997	$56,887	8,010	3,361
1164	Clay	Kansas	$24,503	$45,233	$57,236	8,500	3,407
1165	Rock	Nebraska	$24,501	$43,500	$55,625	1,436	666
1166	Buffalo	Wisconsin	$24,500	$47,384	$58,708	13,466	5,777
1167	Bay	Florida	$24,498	$47,461	$57,295	170,704	67,561
1168	Flagler	Florida	$24,497	$47,233	$53,823	97,301	35,647
1169	Cuming	Nebraska	$24,496	$47,500	$58,654	9,095	3,822
1170	Dorchester	South Carolina	$24,495	$53,857	$62,753	139,802	50,321
1171	Winnebago	Illinois	$24,495	$47,072	$58,536	293,384	113,449
1172	Jackson	Iowa	$24,493	$46,467	$56,474	19,737	8,479
1173	Jones	Georgia	$24,485	$51,497	$60,290	28,650	10,384
1174	Susquehanna	Pennsylvania	$24,477	$48,231	$57,595	42,948	17,163
1175	Scott	Illinois	$24,471	$49,669	$61,563	5,288	2,113
1176	Shelby	Indiana	$24,459	$51,440	$60,234	44,511	17,171
1177	Yates	New York	$24,457	$49,335	$60,271	25,293	9,602
1178	Benton	Minnesota	$24,453	$52,200	$64,694	38,756	15,359
1179	Stark	Ohio	$24,453	$45,641	$57,381	375,348	150,003
1180	Wayne	Nebraska	$24,448	$52,147	$69,696	9,499	3,401
1181	Androscoggin	Maine	$24,442	$44,921	$57,444	107,634	44,006
Louisiana			$24,442	$44,874	$56,288	4,567,968	1,707,852
1182	Georgetown	South Carolina	$24,437	$40,131	$51,852	60,280	23,115
1183	White Pine	Nevada	$24,435	$48,586	$63,982	10,023	3,357
1184	Prince George	Virginia	$24,434	$63,074	$70,566	36,462	10,848
1185	Carlton	Minnesota	$24,434	$53,016	$63,548	35,398	13,789
1186	Fergus	Montana	$24,429	$38,344	$52,473	11,517	4,924
1187	Polk	Oregon	$24,426	$52,808	$62,802	75,930	28,239
Tennessee			$24,409	$44,298	$54,779	6,402,387	2,475,195
1188	Des Moines	Iowa	$24,408	$42,451	$53,237	40,301	16,993
1189	Faulkner	Arkansas	$24,401	$50,314	$65,155	115,928	42,413
1190	Jackson	Oregon	$24,378	$44,005	$53,254	205,117	83,140
1191	Vanderburgh	Indiana	$24,378	$43,540	$58,352	180,233	73,963
1192	Antrim	Michigan	$24,370	$45,362	$53,125	23,504	9,731
1193	Pepin	Wisconsin	$24,367	$47,701	$58,770	7,417	3,085
1194	Coos	New Hampshire	$24,367	$41,985	$53,813	32,520	14,531
1195	St. Clair	Michigan	$24,357	$48,066	$58,697	161,865	64,379
1196	Calcasieu	Louisiana	$24,355	$43,499	$55,484	193,528	73,726
1197	Colorado County	Texas	$24,348	$45,146	$55,408	20,776	8,079
1198	Morgan	Illinois	$24,337	$46,809	$62,224	35,424	13,926
1199	Marshall	West Virginia	$24,329	$40,681	$51,779	32,840	14,042
1200	Jack	Texas	$24,325	$49,038	$64,836	9,012	2,972
1201	Sioux	Iowa	$24,324	$57,227	$67,067	34,050	11,623
1202	Boise	Idaho	$24,324	$41,056	$55,586	6,944	2,994
1203	Sherman	Oregon	$24,314	$42,639	$57,115	1,865	827
1204	Clark	Indiana	$24,312	$50,496	$60,754	111,221	42,502
1205	Otsego	Michigan	$24,312	$47,584	$56,823	24,127	9,818
1206	Bullitt	Kentucky	$24,308	$54,836	$62,514	75,250	27,874
1207	Caddo	Louisiana	$24,308	$41,053	$52,823	255,551	98,554
1208	Lavaca	Texas	$24,299	$44,149	$54,765	19,351	7,711
1209	Jasper	Indiana	$24,297	$57,500	$67,259	33,398	11,924
1210	Clark	Illinois	$24,296	$47,405	$55,434	16,284	6,568
1211	Milwaukee	Wisconsin	$24,295	$43,193	$55,164	950,527	379,637
1212	Ellis	Kansas	$24,291	$43,085	$63,712	28,746	11,824
1213	Yamhill	Oregon	$24,290	$54,535	$62,284	99,802	34,138
1214	Howard	Iowa	$24,286	$46,429	$55,582	9,560	3,884
1215	Black Hawk	Iowa	$24,273	$45,747	$61,495	131,468	52,276
1216	Louisa	Iowa	$24,272	$50,583	$57,545	11,348	4,381
1217	Broadwater	Montana	$24,270	$45,932	$49,362	5,666	2,421
1218	Wells	Indiana	$24,269	$48,136	$57,459	27,707	10,904
—	Guaynabo	Puerto Rico	$24,264	$34,060	$43,081	97,924	32,913
1219	Craven	North Carolina	$24,260	$47,141	$55,689	104,041	39,931
1220	Judith Basin	Montana	$24,260	$41,932	$55,089	2,043	879
1221	Rich	Utah	$24,258	$50,000	$65,250	2,279	664
1222	Gibson	Indiana	$24,258	$49,329	$61,861	33,514	13,094
1223	Nez Perce	Idaho	$24,257	$46,503	$58,875	39,458	16,019
1224	Bexar	Texas	$24,253	$50,112	$58,289	1,753,238	604,698
1225	Ector	Texas	$24,247	$51,466	$59,067	141,542	49,962
1226	Franklin	Mississippi	$24,234	$32,372	$39,234	8,013	3,311
1227	Lane	Oregon	$24,224	$42,931	$56,605	353,382	144,912
1228	Platte	Nebraska	$24,219	$51,213	$60,814	32,350	12,477
1229	Adams	Illinois	$24,217	$45,073	$58,992	67,152	26,912
Oklahoma			$24,208	$45,339	$56,464	3,785,742	1,444,081
1230	Marshall	South Dakota	$24,205	$46,597	$64,375	4,657	1,683
1231	Webster	Iowa	$24,203	$41,624	$57,137	37,626	15,458
1232	Wabaunsee	Kansas	$24,199	$54,694	$65,417	7,050	2,693
1233	Adams	Colorado	$24,195	$56,270	$64,611	452,030	152,803
1234	Wyoming County	Pennsylvania	$24,195	$48,482	$58,479	28,177	10,992
1235	Erie	Pennsylvania	$24,189	$45,202	$58,451	280,518	109,675
1236	Lake	Florida	$24,183	$45,035	$54,237	300,926	117,250
1237	Warren	Pennsylvania	$24,179	$43,764	$56,410	41,429	17,257
1238	Garfield	Oklahoma	$24,177	$44,530	$53,572	60,956	23,508
1239	Rush	Kansas	$24,175	$42,610	$52,727	3,233	1,529
1240	Jasper	Illinois	$24,174	$52,233	$59,406	9,680	3,904
1241	Schuyler	New York	$24,173	$46,976	$58,866	18,432	7,684
1242	Leon	Texas	$24,170	$44,452	$54,609	16,802	6,349
1243	Paulding	Georgia	$24,168	$61,837	$67,668	143,845	47,881
1244	Washington County	New York	$24,168	$52,361	$61,494	63,237	24,499
1245	Berkeley	South Carolina	$24,165	$52,427	$59,373	184,366	65,392
1246	Otsego	New York	$24,165	$47,765	$60,526	62,029	24,078
1247	Alleghany	Virginia	$24,162	$44,848	$59,384	16,240	6,773
1248	Anderson	Kentucky	$24,161	$52,646	$64,806	21,575	8,323
1249	Mercer	Ohio	$24,157	$52,535	$64,758	40,811	15,851
1250	Kane	Utah	$24,154	$48,540	$58,883	7,176	3,077
1251	Campbell	South Dakota	$24,152	$35,729	$50,938	1,435	679
1252	Hardin	Kentucky	$24,147	$48,687	$58,565	106,211	39,401
1253	Allegan	Michigan	$24,140	$52,061	$59,509	111,742	41,794
1254	Chickasaw	Iowa	$24,139	$43,971	$55,735	12,379	5,364
1255	Mercer	Kentucky	$24,138	$45,396	$58,533	21,313	8,745
1256	Pipestone	Minnesota	$24,137	$46,019	$56,071	9,470	3,924
1257	Holt	Missouri	$24,127	$42,979	$53,578	4,771	2,218
1258	Marion	Indiana	$24,124	$42,334	$52,417	912,242	360,072
60%	60th Percentile		$24,122				
1259	Holt	Nebraska	$24,120	$44,427	$58,608	10,435	4,469
1260	Jackson	Kansas	$24,117	$54,546	$63,807	13,430	5,273
1261	Marshall	Iowa	$24,117	$51,555	$60,501	40,800	15,350
1262	Terrebonne	Louisiana	$24,114	$49,960	$60,417	111,868	39,279
1263	Rock	Minnesota	$24,101	$46,623	$58,835	9,601	3,970
1264	Wabash	Illinois	$24,096	$47,365	$61,412	11,848	4,785
1265	Rock	Wisconsin	$24,094	$49,435	$60,120	160,345	63,309
1266	Throckmorton	Texas	$24,086	$39,286	$42,368	1,623	758
1267	Franklin	Indiana	$24,085	$49,516	$63,675	23,042	8,551
1268	Itasca	Minnesota	$24,079	$46,912	$56,705	45,219	18,862
1269	Carroll	Missouri	$24,073	$46,002	$61,400	9,216	3,613
1270	Howard	Indiana	$24,071	$43,590	$57,615	82,795	34,544
1271	Gregg	Texas	$24,064	$45,525	$56,869	122,258	45,292
1272	Stonewall	Texas	$24,063	$42,429	$54,167	1,363	578
1273	Huerfano	Colorado	$24,058	$33,298	$41,862	6,625	3,059
1274	Wood	West Virginia	$24,042	$42,287	$53,647	86,779	35,569
1275	Fremont	Wyoming	$24,037	$50,418	$60,397	40,517	15,425
1276	Shelby	Ohio	$24,028	$50,427	$60,939	49,317	18,311
1277	Kingman	Kansas	$24,026	$47,466	$58,299	7,860	3,223
1278	Beadle	South Dakota	$24,025	$42,196	$58,207	17,663	7,343
1279	Madison	Ohio	$24,014	$54,956	$65,696	43,221	14,611
1280	Berrien	Michigan	$24,013	$43,633	$56,324	156,290	60,414
1281	Wayne	Pennsylvania	$24,005	$49,313	$58,934	52,212	19,558
1282	Grayson	Texas	$24,003	$46,429	$57,313	121,292	46,559
1283	Horry	South Carolina	$24,002	$42,431	$51,252	276,688	113,490
1284	Lemhi	Idaho	$23,998	$34,122	$53,709	7,853	3,832
1285	Bosque	Texas	$23,992	$44,742	$53,835	18,094	7,012
1286	Owen	Kentucky	$23,991	$41,009	$60,356	10,807	4,601
1287	Pulaski	Virginia	$23,987	$44,312	$54,224	34,768	14,875
1288	Livingston	New York	$23,978	$53,518	$66,664	65,087	24,092
1289	Steuben	Indiana	$23,975	$48,080	$56,300	34,190	13,514
1290	Mahoning	Ohio	$23,975	$41,058	$54,118	237,033	98,201
1291	Volusia	Florida	$23,973	$42,457	$53,086	496,268	195,907
1292	Curry	Oregon	$23,972	$39,516	$48,833	22,361	10,355
1293	Hansford	Texas	$23,969	$49,150	$57,703	5,566	1,983
1294	Custer	Idaho	$23,965	$39,541	$60,954	4,331	1,870
1295	Beckham	Oklahoma	$23,959	$48,989	$60,852	22,715	7,755
1296	Treasure	Montana	$23,948	$37,105	$47,206	711	332
South Carolina			$23,943	$44,779	$55,058	4,679,602	1,780,251
1297	Roane	Tennessee	$23,936	$42,223	$52,729	53,765	22,117
1298	Lake	Indiana	$23,918	$49,035	$60,080	494,250	182,080
1299	Christian	Illinois	$23,915	$45,145	$56,066	34,651	14,138
1300	Custer	Montana	$23,910	$43,524	$58,594	11,785	4,986
1301	Lapeer	Michigan	$23,907	$52,939	$60,597	88,323	32,684
1302	Oconee	South Carolina	$23,904	$41,394	$49,753	74,419	30,106
1303	Dickinson	Kansas	$23,895	$48,890	$58,884	19,734	7,845
1304	Penobscot	Maine	$23,895	$43,734	$56,155	153,649	62,608
1305	Pacific	Washington	$23,888	$39,830	$50,919	20,781	9,366
1306	Lucas	Ohio	$23,885	$41,556	$55,295	439,511	178,101
1307	Jackson	Mississippi	$23,879	$48,943	$58,357	139,906	50,007
1308	Knox	Ohio	$23,878	$49,750	$59,561	60,925	22,583
1309	Clay	Nebraska	$23,876	$46,784	$54,762	6,469	2,647
1310	Blair	Pennsylvania	$23,875	$42,992	$55,446	126,940	51,433
Utah			$23,873	$58,821	$66,646	2,813,673	886,770
1311	St. Clair	Alabama	$23,872	$50,786	$57,643	84,521	31,353
1312	Crockett	Texas	$23,872	$50,475	$57,050	3,840	1,375
1313	King and Queen	Virginia	$23,868	$48,372	$55,182	7,020	2,863
1314	Gallatin	Illinois	$23,862	$40,330	$53,250	5,516	2,369
1315	Elmore	Alabama	$23,856	$54,766	$65,479	79,895	28,324
1316	Warren	Kentucky	$23,853	$44,135	$60,772	115,438	44,240
1317	Pickaway	Ohio	$23,851	$54,003	$64,576	55,949	19,167
1318	Sullivan	Tennessee	$23,850	$39,479	$50,725	156,741	66,239
1319	Fulton	New York	$23,839	$44,276	$54,619	55,165	22,611
1320	Greeley	Nebraska	$23,833	$44,950	$55,909	2,507	1,011
1321	Grant	Oregon	$23,828	$35,051	$46,000	7,359	3,319
1322	Columbia	Washington	$23,814	$42,519	$50,956	4,027	1,651
1323	Washita	Oklahoma	$23,811	$46,686	$53,912	11,631	4,630
1324	Robertson	Tennessee	$23,809	$52,792	$60,073	66,623	24,136
1325	Walla Walla	Washington	$23,809	$46,597	$59,108	59,092	21,677
1326	Perquimans	North Carolina	$23,809	$43,709	$51,103	13,463	5,437
1327	Sawyer	Wisconsin	$23,809	$39,904	$46,831	16,542	7,663
1328	Uintah	Utah	$23,805	$62,067	$65,922	33,722	11,007
1329	Wichita	Kansas	$23,799	$53,018	$54,952	2,231	877
1330	Bay	Michigan	$23,799	$45,376	$55,652	107,312	44,127
1331	Taylor	Iowa	$23,793	$43,804	$51,701	6,256	2,764
1332	Marquette	Michigan	$23,789	$45,622	$61,103	67,358	26,436
1333	Mahaska	Iowa	$23,788	$47,967	$59,173	22,428	9,073
1334	Blount	Tennessee	$23,788	$45,991	$56,626	123,722	48,728
1335	Butte	California	$23,787	$43,752	$55,917	220,542	84,816
1336	Moultrie	Illinois	$23,786	$46,622	$55,610	14,869	5,676
1337	Dinwiddie	Virginia	$23,781	$52,027	$58,543	27,977	9,932
1338	Kankakee	Illinois	$23,779	$50,102	$61,559	112,991	41,245
1339	Harvey	Kansas	$23,775	$50,287	$65,591	34,722	13,287
1340	Lubbock	Texas	$23,773	$44,397	$56,425	282,633	105,277
1341	Phillips	Kansas	$23,772	$43,059	$55,102	5,573	2,388
1342	Dixon	Nebraska	$23,769	$47,325	$57,946	5,953	2,348
1343	Rooks	Kansas	$23,768	$42,449	$53,029	5,189	2,349
1344	Morgan	Alabama	$23,764	$44,800	$55,536	119,673	46,192
New Mexico			$23,763	$44,927	$54,513	2,069,706	761,938
1345	Transylvania	North Carolina	$23,757	$41,781	$51,702	32,894	13,981
1346	Morrison	Minnesota	$23,753	$47,649	$60,155	33,118	13,416
1347	Colfax	Nebraska	$23,751	$51,765	$61,841	10,495	3,686
1348	Cape Girardeau	Missouri	$23,751	$46,516	$57,604	76,322	29,411
1349	Hayes	Nebraska	$23,749	$49,125	$56,125	1,142	477
1350	Pointe Coupee	Louisiana	$23,742	$45,363	$59,064	22,736	8,818
1351	Elk	Pennsylvania	$23,738	$45,767	$55,378	31,799	13,478
1352	Pasco	Florida	$23,736	$43,888	$53,807	468,194	182,707
1353	Douglas	Illinois	$23,732	$52,741	$65,220	19,902	7,509
1354	Pamlico	North Carolina	$23,724	$43,853	$54,679	13,115	5,146
1355	Price	Wisconsin	$23,723	$42,644	$53,902	14,025	6,776
1356	DeWitt	Texas	$23,720	$46,454	$55,394	20,269	6,948
1357	Hancock	Illinois	$23,714	$43,925	$54,700	18,949	8,101
1358	Tom Green	Texas	$23,712	$44,545	$57,722	111,969	42,286
1359	Adams	Iowa	$23,707	$45,871	$56,552	3,973	1,745
1360	Norman	Minnesota	$23,707	$45,389	$59,103	6,753	2,737
1361	DeKalb	Illinois	$23,696	$53,375	$71,343	104,820	37,844
1362	Tippecanoe	Indiana	$23,691	$44,246	$63,086	175,628	66,667
1363	Lincoln	Kansas	$23,686	$40,811	$54,167	3,199	1,414
1364	Nance	Nebraska	$23,684	$44,286	$54,402	3,707	1,534
1365	Lyon	Iowa	$23,683	$52,152	$62,459	11,659	4,425
1366	Columbia	Pennsylvania	$23,681	$44,807	$56,917	67,021	26,225
Alabama			$23,680	$43,253	$54,362	4,799,277	1,838,683
1367	Delaware County	New York	$23,677	$44,470	$56,427	47,491	19,844
1368	Cheyenne	Kansas	$23,677	$37,875	$53,571	2,708	1,343
1369	Nueces	Texas	$23,671	$47,057	$54,483	344,257	123,915
1370	Shasta	California	$23,670	$44,651	$54,222	177,966	68,980
1371	Bradford	Pennsylvania	$23,667	$46,963	$56,198	62,624	24,213
1372	White	Indiana	$23,666	$51,444	$60,995	24,542	9,541
1373	Armstrong	Pennsylvania	$23,661	$45,241	$55,063	68,614	28,525
1374	Schuyler	Illinois	$23,656	$48,138	$58,547	7,490	3,056
1375	Palo Pinto	Texas	$23,655	$41,670	$51,399	28,017	10,491
1376	Cheyenne	Colorado	$23,647	$51,641	$63,938	2,189	839
1377	Cabell	West Virginia	$23,647	$38,374	$52,300	96,604	40,144
1378	Hall	Georgia	$23,645	$50,853	$58,295	182,841	61,220
1379	Spencer	Indiana	$23,641	$52,991	$64,930	20,960	7,984
1380	Lafayette	Missouri	$23,637	$50,527	$65,057	33,188	13,117
1381	Appomattox	Virginia	$23,636	$50,167	$59,252	15,054	5,803
1382	Winkler	Texas	$23,629	$48,992	$55,668	7,260	2,709
1383	Douglas	Georgia	$23,626	$52,691	$58,918	133,486	46,295
1384	Fall River	South Dakota	$23,624	$37,667	$58,910	7,001	3,138
1385	Richland	Illinois	$23,621	$44,070	$57,038	16,213	6,620
1386	Cochise	Arizona	$23,608	$45,755	$55,120	131,038	49,174
1387	Williamson	Illinois	$23,605	$43,125	$54,242	66,606	26,819
1388	Sutter	California	$23,602	$50,408	$57,129	94,787	31,725
1389	Riverside	California	$23,591	$56,529	$63,378	2,228,528	683,144
1390	Caribou	Idaho	$23,586	$53,586	$63,545	6,867	2,644
1391	Caledonia	Vermont	$23,584	$45,395	$54,941	31,157	12,491
1392	Kiowa	Oklahoma	$23,576	$36,281	$46,015	9,389	3,886
1393	Richardson	Nebraska	$23,566	$38,582	$49,080	8,289	3,779
1394	Silver Bow	Montana	$23,562	$38,659	$53,713	34,322	15,042
1395	Grand	Utah	$23,558	$45,888	$62,627	9,269	3,633
1396	Cowlitz	Washington	$23,557	$47,596	$56,810	102,110	39,602
1397	Marinette	Wisconsin	$23,555	$40,490	$53,495	41,632	18,573
1398	Hitchcock	Nebraska	$23,554	$39,702	$56,875	2,884	1,366
1399	Montgomery	Virginia	$23,548	$45,543	$66,800	94,910	34,789
1400	Montezuma	Colorado	$23,548	$43,188	$49,245	25,512	10,688
1401	Nelson	Kentucky	$23,545	$43,833	$54,708	43,905	16,571
1402	Mason	Washington	$23,542	$48,755	$57,662	60,647	23,358
1403	Humboldt	California	$23,540	$41,426	$52,974	134,613	53,296
1404	Pender	North Carolina	$23,526	$44,524	$53,740	53,412	20,254
1405	Greene	Missouri	$23,520	$40,337	$53,359	278,231	115,574
1406	Cimarron	Oklahoma	$23,514	$38,301	$49,600	2,432	1,067
1407	Lauderdale	Alabama	$23,510	$42,844	$55,673	92,666	38,458
1408	St. Joseph	Indiana	$23,509	$44,582	$56,861	266,694	101,947
1409	Golden Valley	Montana	$23,508	$39,313	$50,938	709	323
1410	Lee	Alabama	$23,506	$43,542	$61,629	144,405	55,864
1411	Aurora	South Dakota	$23,504	$46,667	$56,389	2,722	1,102
1412	Grady	Oklahoma	$23,500	$49,637	$57,046	52,855	19,762
1413	Shawano	Wisconsin	$23,500	$46,559	$54,485	41,776	17,245
1414	Page	Iowa	$23,496	$43,010	$57,784	15,838	6,415
1415	Washington County	Ohio	$23,496	$42,834	$55,505	61,600	25,029
1416	Pierce	North Dakota	$23,491	$42,975	$63,243	4,399	1,983
1417	Marquette	Wisconsin	$23,490	$46,077	$55,060	15,308	6,453
1418	Giles	Virginia	$23,485	$45,141	$54,697	17,111	7,167
1419	Lafayette	Wisconsin	$23,483	$49,107	$59,593	16,841	6,605
1420	Goshen	Wyoming	$23,475	$43,257	$51,882	13,458	5,255
1421	Northampton	Virginia	$23,473	$33,635	$52,742	12,339	5,149
1422	Clarke	Iowa	$23,472	$43,216	$59,972	9,311	3,672
Kentucky			$23,462	$43,036	$54,279	4,361,333	1,694,996
1423	Rockdale	Georgia	$23,461	$52,579	$58,441	85,650	29,317
1424	Cheatham	Tennessee	$23,459	$52,446	$61,433	39,213	14,421
1425	Monroe	Wisconsin	$23,456	$49,774	$61,851	44,953	17,543
1426	Cottonwood	Minnesota	$23,456	$45,294	$55,081	11,658	4,802
1427	Escambia	Florida	$23,441	$43,918	$55,382	300,795	111,689
1428	Perry	Missouri	$23,435	$47,876	$58,656	19,001	7,511
1429	Lampasas	Texas	$23,423	$49,277	$58,034	19,937	7,289
1430	Winona	Minnesota	$23,421	$47,468	$67,948	51,328	18,957
1431	Jackson	Texas	$23,418	$49,528	$62,062	14,201	5,212
1432	Herkimer	New York	$23,418	$45,047	$55,976	64,428	26,815
1433	Montgomery	New York	$23,417	$44,156	$55,028	50,019	19,703
1434	Cheboygan	Michigan	$23,412	$38,410	$46,010	25,985	11,477
1435	Duchesne	Utah	$23,411	$57,683	$63,048	19,109	6,850
1436	Rush	Indiana	$23,396	$47,401	$56,923	17,257	6,874
1437	Fayette	Iowa	$23,391	$45,542	$60,296	20,822	8,328
1438	Matagorda	Texas	$23,389	$43,096	$51,190	36,639	13,260
1439	Hutchinson	Texas	$23,383	$44,731	$51,838	21,986	8,374
1440	Ochiltree	Texas	$23,382	$49,964	$60,121	10,467	3,736
1441	Coconino	Arizona	$23,382	$49,555	$59,308	134,795	46,198
1442	Reno	Kansas	$23,382	$43,798	$54,770	64,319	25,693
1443	Calhoun	Texas	$23,381	$47,027	$56,167	21,503	7,870
1444	Hall	Nebraska	$23,380	$48,712	$56,897	59,431	22,168
1445	Coffee	Alabama	$23,380	$43,768	$58,898	50,468	18,820
1446	Jones	South Dakota	$23,377	$44,808	$53,854	981	438
1447	Preble	Ohio	$23,374	$48,405	$57,530	42,050	16,238
1448	San Patricio	Texas	$23,373	$50,657	$56,069	65,210	22,147
1449	Edgar	Illinois	$23,368	$42,133	$51,601	18,339	7,893
1450	Champaign	Ohio	$23,358	$49,157	$58,486	39,855	15,014
1451	Stephenson	Illinois	$23,350	$43,472	$54,367	47,315	19,408
1452	Henry	Ohio	$23,347	$49,439	$61,426	28,164	11,006
1453	Mason	Kentucky	$23,347	$41,137	$48,486	17,452	6,569
1454	Juneau	Wisconsin	$23,343	$45,297	$54,255	26,673	10,194
1455	Bastrop	Texas	$23,342	$51,750	$61,250	74,730	25,432
1456	Barron	Wisconsin	$23,337	$44,054	$54,827	45,826	19,168
1457	Ringgold	Iowa	$23,324	$44,551	$53,353	5,107	2,074
1458	Iron	Wisconsin	$23,324	$39,051	$49,059	5,937	2,953
1459	Red Willow	Nebraska	$23,320	$42,345	$58,831	11,015	4,732
1460	Houston	Alabama	$23,316	$40,948	$52,214	102,326	39,250
1461	Harrison	West Virginia	$23,309	$43,183	$54,364	69,078	27,599
1462	Moore	Tennessee	$23,307	$46,170	$59,462	6,347	2,416
1463	Mendocino	California	$23,306	$43,469	$54,459	87,497	33,878
1464	Ralls	Missouri	$23,299	$47,969	$54,936	10,206	4,044
1465	Roanoke City	Virginia	$23,295	$38,145	$48,879	97,355	42,494
1466	St. Lucie	Florida	$23,285	$43,413	$50,334	281,015	106,060
1467	Madison	Tennessee	$23,283	$41,617	$54,519	98,261	35,713
1468	Tripp	South Dakota	$23,270	$39,324	$48,547	5,571	2,530
1469	Woodbury	Iowa	$23,269	$45,856	$57,202	102,155	38,654
1470	Gosper	Nebraska	$23,266	$45,893	$58,583	2,005	767
1471	Washington County	Arkansas	$23,264	$41,248	$54,190	207,911	79,214
1472	Custer	Oklahoma	$23,261	$44,972	$56,889	28,092	10,562
1473	Hancock	West Virginia	$23,261	$38,522	$49,200	30,517	12,890
1474	Red Lake	Minnesota	$23,257	$47,569	$59,600	4,087	1,681
1475	Jackson	Georgia	$23,247	$53,179	$61,088	60,577	21,293
1476	Harrison	Indiana	$23,244	$50,510	$59,691	39,213	14,499
1477	Stafford	Kansas	$23,240	$43,292	$56,667	4,391	1,884
1478	Grant	Arkansas	$23,239	$49,004	$58,808	17,922	6,855
1479	Harrison	Texas	$23,236	$45,675	$55,113	66,467	23,415
1480	Jefferson	Texas	$23,236	$42,568	$53,650	252,157	92,634
1481	Baker	Oregon	$23,234	$41,500	$51,199	16,055	7,120
1482	Kiowa	Kansas	$23,232	$44,650	$57,647	2,527	1,065
1483	Catawba	North Carolina	$23,232	$44,332	$54,596	154,432	58,533
1484	Campbell	Virginia	$23,231	$47,162	$56,168	54,967	21,774
1485	Pawnee	Kansas	$23,230	$44,078	$56,750	6,971	2,545
1486	Marion	West Virginia	$23,229	$42,152	$53,822	56,666	22,593
1487	Valley	Nebraska	$23,227	$40,445	$54,364	4,256	1,893
1488	Sebastian	Arkansas	$23,222	$40,471	$50,511	126,536	49,294
1489	Bonner	Idaho	$23,221	$41,414	$49,568	40,743	17,388
1490	Scotts Bluff	Nebraska	$23,220	$43,444	$53,463	36,883	14,690
1491	Wythe	Virginia	$23,219	$41,275	$49,044	29,274	11,656
1492	Lonoke	Arkansas	$23,218	$52,582	$60,786	69,266	25,052
1493	Macon	North Carolina	$23,213	$37,892	$45,633	33,859	15,340
1494	Nicholas	West Virginia	$23,209	$40,064	$48,275	26,168	10,657
1495	Fulton	Pennsylvania	$23,201	$48,461	$56,346	14,779	5,965
1496	Mason	Illinois	$23,199	$42,260	$56,188	14,508	6,310
1497	Hanson	South Dakota	$23,197	$55,815	$64,375	3,377	1,037
1498	Bond	Illinois	$23,195	$48,163	$61,238	17,665	6,373
1499	Mason	Michigan	$23,183	$41,136	$50,719	28,648	12,470
1500	Cortland	New York	$23,179	$47,151	$60,134	49,271	18,069
1501	Refugio	Texas	$23,174	$44,548	$48,963	7,327	2,818
1502	Miami-Dade	Florida	$23,174	$43,100	$49,138	2,549,075	828,031
1503	Callaway	Missouri	$23,171	$47,964	$58,357	44,276	16,548
1504	Garland	Arkansas	$23,170	$39,162	$48,388	96,547	39,881
1505	Pend Oreille	Washington	$23,167	$40,567	$47,847	12,956	5,484
1506	Alamance	North Carolina	$23,166	$43,043	$53,945	152,472	60,139
1507	Toole	Montana	$23,162	$46,972	$53,259	5,224	1,927
1508	Boyd	Nebraska	$23,157	$41,279	$51,250	2,093	938
1509	Citrus	Florida	$23,148	$39,100	$48,013	140,214	60,319
1510	Mineral	Nevada	$23,146	$35,017	$61,226	4,700	2,147
1511	Taylor	Texas	$23,141	$44,891	$56,565	132,588	49,304
1512	Portsmouth City	Virginia	$23,138	$46,166	$53,632	95,901	36,690
1513	Craighead	Arkansas	$23,138	$41,393	$52,466	98,398	37,834
1514	Jewell	Kansas	$23,134	$39,884	$51,957	3,061	1,454
1515	Stanton	Nebraska	$23,131	$51,493	$60,886	6,148	2,336
1516	Wallowa	Oregon	$23,131	$41,994	$54,513	6,924	2,996
1517	Wood	Texas	$23,129	$43,649	$52,446	42,089	15,800
1518	Williamsburg City	Virginia	$23,127	$48,616	$64,329	14,579	4,391
1519	Oswego	New York	$23,126	$48,051	$59,391	121,797	45,325
1520	Day	South Dakota	$23,126	$39,761	$48,450	5,669	2,511
1521	Pendleton	Kentucky	$23,122	$45,480	$57,357	14,714	5,357
1522	Seneca	New York	$23,115	$47,618	$60,974	35,359	13,429
1523	Weber	Utah	$23,106	$54,974	$62,642	233,871	79,525
1524	Brookings	South Dakota	$23,105	$46,896	$61,219	32,295	11,979
1525	Trego	Kansas	$23,095	$45,714	$56,090	2,981	1,232
1526	Snyder	Pennsylvania	$23,088	$46,513	$53,072	39,711	14,397
1527	Jefferson	New York	$23,078	$46,484	$55,325	118,073	45,011
1528	Washington County	Texas	$23,070	$44,858	$55,675	33,863	12,244
1529	Shelby	Illinois	$23,069	$47,188	$56,074	22,266	8,991
1530	Faulk	South Dakota	$23,069	$41,453	$54,219	2,370	930
1531	Rice	Kansas	$23,068	$45,336	$57,196	10,055	3,914
1532	Cumberland	North Carolina	$23,067	$45,231	$51,944	322,033	121,226
1533	Hamilton	Texas	$23,067	$40,655	$48,894	8,410	3,029
1534	Fountain	Indiana	$23,063	$45,884	$54,191	17,108	6,925
1535	Wayne	Ohio	$23,061	$49,135	$60,737	114,750	42,487
1536	Tipton	Tennessee	$23,054	$52,423	$59,729	61,298	21,574
1537	Benton	Indiana	$23,049	$48,711	$57,079	8,823	3,444
1538	St. Louis City	Missouri	$23,048	$34,582	$43,627	318,955	140,652
1539	Arkansas County	Arkansas	$23,045	$39,633	$50,137	18,957	7,883
1540	Cleburne	Arkansas	$23,044	$40,246	$49,059	25,856	10,286
1541	Gregory	South Dakota	$23,041	$36,719	$43,160	4,247	1,986
1542	Stephens	Oklahoma	$23,038	$43,885	$57,834	44,929	17,690
1543	Camden	Missouri	$23,038	$43,458	$49,942	43,822	17,647
1544	Taylor	Wisconsin	$23,032	$44,869	$56,250	20,633	8,761
1545	Monroe	Indiana	$23,032	$40,052	$62,959	139,634	53,914
1546	Pitt	North Carolina	$23,029	$40,718	$56,512	170,485	66,026
1547	Calhoun	South Carolina	$23,023	$40,704	$49,517	15,109	6,163
1548	Roscommon	Michigan	$23,023	$33,334	$40,691	24,281	11,617
1549	Musselshell	Montana	$23,022	$43,409	$59,112	4,729	1,966
1550	Schuylkill	Pennsylvania	$23,021	$45,012	$56,974	147,700	59,658
1551	Union	Iowa	$23,007	$44,838	$55,380	12,547	5,339
1552	Iberia	Louisiana	$22,997	$44,262	$51,402	73,551	26,496
1553	Lycoming	Pennsylvania	$22,987	$45,430	$57,160	116,604	46,046
1554	Franklin	Kansas	$22,979	$49,543	$58,750	25,870	9,909
1555	Calhoun	Michigan	$22,978	$42,110	$52,857	135,534	53,428
1556	Langlade	Wisconsin	$22,974	$42,389	$50,629	19,838	8,758
1557	Sumner	Kansas	$22,972	$47,894	$61,676	23,884	9,110
1558	Worth	Missouri	$22,967	$39,348	$49,034	2,129	940
1559	Stoddard	Missouri	$22,967	$37,965	$49,565	29,860	12,224
West Virginia			$22,966	$41,043	$52,165	1,853,619	741,390
1560	Daviess	Kentucky	$22,963	$46,555	$57,866	97,230	37,677
1561	Upton	Texas	$22,953	$51,750	$57,391	3,323	1,218
1562	Cumberland	Illinois	$22,952	$43,958	$54,423	11,015	4,184
1563	Riley	Kansas	$22,948	$43,962	$63,634	73,243	25,895
1564	Lewis	New York	$22,942	$46,840	$55,401	27,108	10,677
1565	Norton	Kansas	$22,942	$46,029	$63,182	5,640	2,248
1566	Indiana County	Pennsylvania	$22,933	$43,997	$56,225	88,404	34,310
1567	Jackson	Oklahoma	$22,925	$42,824	$51,599	26,280	10,455
1568	Sullivan	Pennsylvania	$22,923	$40,964	$50,855	6,419	2,402
1569	Ste. Genevieve	Missouri	$22,921	$48,433	$55,208	17,996	7,235
1570	Bowie	Texas	$22,911	$42,346	$53,995	92,851	33,808
1571	Cooper	Missouri	$22,910	$45,992	$56,565	17,574	6,568
1572	Lawrence	Pennsylvania	$22,906	$43,546	$55,348	90,374	36,823
50%	50th Percentile		$22,900				
1573	Wichita	Texas	$22,837	$42,971	$52,514	131,500	49,016
1574	Trinity	California	$22,905	$36,890	$47,349	13,638	5,668
1575	Buena Vista	Iowa	$22,899	$46,951	$58,937	20,350	7,615
1576	Montrose	Colorado	$22,897	$45,718	$55,848	41,020	16,586
1577	Bourbon	Kentucky	$22,893	$40,933	$48,310	19,999	7,865
1578	Mille Lacs	Minnesota	$22,891	$47,862	$57,885	25,927	10,312
1579	Phillips	Montana	$22,890	$42,632	$54,746	4,205	1,800
1580	Monroe	Georgia	$22,888	$48,630	$57,440	26,613	9,550
1581	Waushara	Wisconsin	$22,888	$43,070	$52,816	24,483	9,902
1582	Nash	North Carolina	$22,880	$43,084	$52,681	95,571	37,726
1583	Dolores	Colorado	$22,880	$37,750	$51,875	1,709	780
1584	Lincoln	Nevada	$22,879	$40,143	$48,816	5,296	1,969
1585	Logan	Ohio	$22,878	$47,542	$53,810	45,678	18,143
1586	Freestone	Texas	$22,876	$44,502	$54,284	19,657	7,251
1587	Vermillion	Indiana	$22,875	$42,524	$50,674	16,098	6,466
1588	Waynesboro City	Virginia	$22,872	$44,847	$57,726	21,099	8,708
1589	Beaverhead	Montana	$22,872	$41,614	$54,294	9,278	4,110
1590	Ravalli	Montana	$22,872	$38,688	$51,272	40,423	16,848
1591	Montgomery	Iowa	$22,868	$44,281	$53,586	10,625	4,553
1592	Scurry	Texas	$22,860	$47,513	$56,620	17,014	5,846
1593	Bell	Texas	$22,857	$50,060	$58,115	316,144	104,049
1594	Muscogee	Georgia	$22,856	$41,339	$50,999	194,949	72,243
1595	Callahan	Texas	$22,855	$44,902	$57,957	13,535	5,201
1596	Waldo	Maine	$22,853	$42,221	$52,614	38,819	16,448
1597	LaPorte	Indiana	$22,852	$47,538	$58,674	111,310	42,690
1598	Collingsworth	Texas	$22,847	$41,576	$48,250	3,061	1,174
1599	Wasco	Oregon	$22,844	$43,765	$53,598	25,281	9,612
1600	Burnett	Wisconsin	$22,843	$39,564	$47,404	15,449	7,354
1601	Mercer	Pennsylvania	$22,831	$44,301	$55,943	116,059	46,187
1602	DeKalb	Indiana	$22,827	$47,247	$56,561	42,253	16,032
1603	Walton	Georgia	$22,824	$52,369	$60,249	84,397	29,520
1604	Harper	Kansas	$22,820	$38,313	$48,333	5,951	2,595
1605	Martin	Indiana	$22,817	$44,740	$55,776	10,269	4,146
1606	Brooke	West Virginia	$22,815	$42,493	$55,605	23,932	9,968
1607	Daggett	Utah	$22,811	$46,917	$67,898	830	305
1608	Sandusky	Ohio	$22,799	$46,140	$56,634	60,619	23,906
1609	Logan	Nebraska	$22,799	$44,417	$52,813	787	345
1610	Teton	Montana	$22,799	$43,327	$54,196	6,063	2,303
1611	Kittitas	Washington	$22,796	$42,982	$63,929	41,291	16,538
1612	Van Wert	Ohio	$22,790	$45,355	$57,364	28,685	11,442
1613	Ellsworth	Kansas	$22,789	$45,865	$58,566	6,454	2,528
1614	Presque Isle	Michigan	$22,788	$39,652	$46,601	13,234	6,253
1615	Caldwell	Louisiana	$22,782	$39,385	$47,327	10,083	3,935
1616	Clark	Ohio	$22,780	$43,136	$54,149	137,763	54,963
1617	Richland	Wisconsin	$22,778	$45,271	$55,208	17,911	7,343
1618	Maury	Tennessee	$22,766	$45,336	$55,558	81,821	32,144
1619	Grant	New Mexico	$22,755	$37,899	$45,616	29,471	12,216
1620	Crawford	Iowa	$22,748	$46,548	$57,067	17,205	6,300
1621	Cameron	Pennsylvania	$22,747	$41,410	$52,800	5,000	2,144
1622	Henderson	Kentucky	$22,746	$41,940	$54,654	46,303	18,787
1623	Pasquotank	North Carolina	$22,745	$46,053	$55,554	40,419	14,399
1624	Sweet Grass	Montana	$22,743	$45,938	$58,462	3,640	1,304
1625	Cass	Michigan	$22,743	$44,346	$55,053	52,212	19,663
1626	Defiance	Ohio	$22,739	$47,593	$55,802	38,911	15,203
1627	Yadkin	North Carolina	$22,726	$40,371	$50,372	38,217	14,926
1628	Alcona	Michigan	$22,719	$37,189	$45,424	10,785	4,863
1629	Paulding	Ohio	$22,714	$44,861	$58,225	19,441	7,730
1630	Petroleum	Montana	$22,714	$41,705	$56,042	538	233
1631	Doniphan	Kansas	$22,713	$46,512	$57,530	7,905	3,161
1632	Shiawassee	Michigan	$22,713	$46,217	$53,971	69,910	27,485
1633	Fisher	Texas	$22,709	$42,125	$55,000	3,924	1,518
1634	Accomack	Virginia	$22,703	$39,328	$48,708	33,289	14,333
1635	Manistee	Michigan	$22,702	$41,551	$49,708	24,626	10,571
1636	Camden	Georgia	$22,701	$51,990	$60,101	50,799	18,386
1637	Wyoming County	New York	$22,700	$51,100	$62,490	41,923	15,624
1638	Wapello	Iowa	$22,699	$41,425	$51,694	35,469	14,534
1639	Norton City	Virginia	$22,699	$39,416	$56,290	3,998	1,706
1640	Henry	Iowa	$22,687	$46,376	$58,504	20,188	7,493
1641	Hancock	Kentucky	$22,686	$51,189	$54,461	8,608	3,361
1642	Dale	Alabama	$22,685	$44,889	$56,132	50,102	19,345
1643	Union	Oregon	$22,684	$42,542	$51,973	25,741	10,235
1644	Vernon	Wisconsin	$22,680	$45,488	$57,070	30,002	11,790
1645	Montgomery	Indiana	$22,679	$46,797	$53,218	38,215	14,590
1646	Harrison	Mississippi	$22,677	$43,124	$51,941	190,756	72,253
1647	Harper	Oklahoma	$22,675	$46,117	$51,087	3,710	1,492
1648	Roberts	South Dakota	$22,670	$47,191	$57,684	10,210	3,646
1649	Cambria	Pennsylvania	$22,659	$41,730	$54,630	142,448	58,208
1650	Gaston	North Carolina	$22,658	$42,017	$51,851	207,263	79,450
1651	Bonneville	Idaho	$22,657	$50,872	$58,034	105,580	36,066
1652	Mills	Texas	$22,651	$44,213	$51,540	4,891	1,817
1653	Lee	Iowa	$22,649	$42,469	$55,274	35,736	14,241
1654	Kershaw	South Carolina	$22,638	$43,765	$52,593	61,918	24,084
1655	Tuscaloosa	Alabama	$22,637	$45,408	$58,922	196,824	67,882
1656	Osage	Missouri	$22,629	$51,408	$61,660	13,842	5,168
1657	Mackinac	Michigan	$22,622	$38,704	$47,542	11,099	5,000
1658	Hancock	Mississippi	$22,621	$44,522	$53,192	44,597	18,145
1659	Tioga	Pennsylvania	$22,621	$44,187	$52,998	42,267	17,058
1660	Washington County	Kansas	$22,621	$42,515	$55,034	5,763	2,487
1661	Jefferson	Illinois	$22,620	$42,981	$55,188	38,769	15,288
1662	Jackson	Michigan	$22,613	$46,615	$57,263	160,126	60,100
1663	Latimer	Oklahoma	$22,603	$40,970	$49,894	11,034	4,160
1664	Huntington	Indiana	$22,601	$46,148	$57,067	37,044	14,138
1665	Surry	Virginia	$22,600	$47,292	$59,331	6,922	2,602
1666	Nobles	Minnesota	$22,598	$48,208	$55,102	21,490	7,964
1667	McPherson	South Dakota	$22,596	$37,240	$44,650	2,432	1,045
1668	San Joaquin	California	$22,589	$53,380	$59,900	693,177	215,563
1669	Vermilion	Louisiana	$22,589	$44,665	$54,061	58,394	21,765
1670	Logan	Colorado	$22,581	$40,415	$50,000	22,607	8,015
1671	Amherst	Virginia	$22,580	$44,945	$56,802	32,244	12,680
Idaho			$22,568	$46,767	$55,905	1,583,364	579,797
1672	Jackson	Indiana	$22,568	$46,501	$56,297	42,769	16,713
1673	Trumbull	Ohio	$22,568	$42,880	$53,975	208,792	86,246
1674	Potter	Pennsylvania	$22,564	$41,547	$50,755	17,487	7,077
1675	Sheridan	Nebraska	$22,551	$38,548	$44,859	5,390	2,380
1676	Davidson	North Carolina	$22,549	$43,083	$54,218	162,975	64,580
1677	Crawford	Wisconsin	$22,549	$42,235	$57,472	16,578	6,772
1678	Morrill	Nebraska	$22,543	$43,886	$50,365	4,958	2,037
1679	Jackson	West Virginia	$22,527	$40,376	$53,355	29,229	11,459
1680	Wayne	Illinois	$22,526	$43,605	$54,060	16,674	7,063
1681	Cumberland	New Jersey	$22,524	$50,750	$60,388	157,342	50,676
1682	Oldham	Texas	$22,519	$48,929	$62,500	2,064	748
1683	Darke	Ohio	$22,511	$43,425	$53,929	52,666	20,776
1684	Beauregard	Louisiana	$22,509	$46,385	$59,364	35,891	12,948
1685	Mobile	Alabama	$22,501	$43,028	$52,234	413,188	155,178
1686	Dunn	Wisconsin	$22,499	$48,893	$62,033	43,871	16,222
1687	Yuma	Colorado	$22,498	$44,308	$53,502	10,093	3,811
1688	Alfalfa	Oklahoma	$22,488	$44,811	$57,604	5,674	2,031
1689	Lea	New Mexico	$22,484	$50,694	$60,006	65,681	21,126
1690	Upshur	Texas	$22,483	$46,600	$58,447	39,640	14,286
1691	Kiowa	Colorado	$22,482	$40,813	$55,938	1,423	559
1692	La Salle	Louisiana	$22,481	$42,528	$55,587	14,843	5,619
1693	Northumberland	Pennsylvania	$22,478	$41,208	$52,280	94,444	39,348
1694	Delta	Michigan	$22,471	$42,676	$53,489	36,967	15,885
1695	Douglas	Washington	$22,467	$51,908	$55,665	38,807	13,976
—	Saint Thomas	U.S. Virgin Islands	$22,458	$38,232	$47,122	51,634	21,555
1696	Tillamook	Oregon	$22,452	$43,676	$51,235	25,300	10,236
1697	Nuckolls	Nebraska	$22,448	$37,594	$52,127	4,462	2,119
1698	Teton	Idaho	$22,436	$53,931	$62,389	10,141	3,583
1699	Florence	Wisconsin	$22,434	$47,960	$52,846	4,477	1,767
1700	Southampton	Virginia	$22,433	$46,150	$58,038	18,444	6,708
1701	Florence	South Carolina	$22,432	$41,910	$51,660	137,393	51,332
1702	McKean	Pennsylvania	$22,426	$41,834	$51,472	43,294	17,450
1703	Medina	Texas	$22,413	$55,326	$61,952	46,512	15,284
1704	Waller	Texas	$22,412	$50,097	$59,684	43,836	13,601
1705	Johnston	North Carolina	$22,410	$49,711	$58,463	172,321	60,759
1706	Franklin	Tennessee	$22,398	$42,904	$48,711	40,985	16,067
1707	Lenawee	Michigan	$22,395	$47,766	$59,156	99,505	37,754
1708	Labette	Kansas	$22,394	$40,916	$49,907	21,369	8,703
1709	Henry	Missouri	$22,394	$39,839	$50,344	22,183	9,551
1710	Todd	Minnesota	$22,383	$45,000	$53,847	24,697	9,904
1711	Wyandot	Ohio	$22,382	$44,448	$57,009	22,582	9,284
1712	Marshall	Kentucky	$22,381	$43,907	$54,460	31,296	11,963
1713	Pontotoc	Oklahoma	$22,381	$41,881	$52,738	37,700	14,793
1714	Montgomery	Tennessee	$22,380	$49,617	$57,117	177,640	64,026
1715	Genesee	Michigan	$22,380	$42,089	$53,072	421,575	165,669
1716	Belmont	Ohio	$22,380	$41,534	$52,232	69,990	28,329
1717	Morton	Kansas	$22,378	$46,607	$51,250	3,182	1,186
1718	Hardin	Illinois	$22,366	$37,071	$46,932	4,273	1,800
1719	Comanche	Oklahoma	$22,363	$46,036	$54,389	124,591	44,251
1720	Warren	Mississippi	$22,362	$41,025	$54,240	48,389	18,404
1721	Page	Virginia	$22,355	$42,906	$49,682	23,975	9,623
1722	Osage	Oklahoma	$22,353	$44,195	$55,339	47,800	18,512
1723	Saginaw	Michigan	$22,349	$42,331	$54,004	198,841	77,412
1724	Hunt	Texas	$22,341	$44,858	$55,101	86,455	30,756
1725	Newton	Missouri	$22,341	$42,268	$50,565	58,552	22,045
1726	Wahkiakum	Washington	$22,334	$41,815	$48,156	4,006	1,715
1727	Menominee	Michigan	$22,331	$41,739	$49,566	23,917	10,787
1728	Creek	Oklahoma	$22,327	$43,026	$52,398	70,246	26,296
1729	Jefferson	Ohio	$22,324	$40,577	$51,183	68,928	28,326
1730	Latah	Idaho	$22,322	$41,735	$60,899	37,636	14,941
1731	Bedford City	Virginia	$22,322	$35,593	$44,058	6,052	2,800
1732	Fulton	Illinois	$22,318	$45,130	$56,215	36,829	14,610
1733	Baca	Colorado	$22,318	$38,829	$48,080	3,761	1,651
1734	Morgan	West Virginia	$22,312	$36,046	$51,724	17,502	7,343
1735	Wayne	Michigan	$22,308	$41,184	$52,423	1,804,507	670,987
1736	Greene	Illinois	$22,307	$43,502	$53,680	13,778	5,790
1737	Orleans	Vermont	$22,303	$41,953	$52,235	27,184	11,043
1738	Granville	North Carolina	$22,295	$49,852	$54,842	58,188	19,953
1739	Allen	Ohio	$22,295	$42,823	$54,846	105,895	40,552
1740	Siskiyou	California	$22,293	$37,709	$47,183	44,503	19,417
1741	Kearny	Kansas	$22,292	$52,264	$60,735	3,956	1,301
1742	Crane	Texas	$22,291	$50,417	$60,625	4,484	1,571
1743	Kanabec	Minnesota	$22,291	$47,068	$54,060	16,151	6,277
1744	Greenwood	Kansas	$22,280	$38,346	$53,288	6,582	2,855
1745	Clay	Illinois	$22,279	$40,640	$52,000	13,744	5,486
1746	Philadelphia	Pennsylvania	$22,279	$37,192	$46,375	1,536,704	580,017
1747	Ward	Texas	$22,278	$42,568	$52,953	10,836	3,938
1748	Marion	Kansas	$22,269	$45,830	$57,375	12,491	4,861
1749	Rabun	Georgia	$22,260	$35,423	$50,864	16,271	6,997
1750	Union	Pennsylvania	$22,259	$48,528	$55,763	44,932	15,062
1751	Bedford	Pennsylvania	$22,259	$43,290	$53,401	49,490	20,198
1752	Huron	Ohio	$22,257	$49,404	$56,337	59,390	22,361
1753	Cass	Illinois	$22,257	$45,734	$53,871	13,530	5,134
1754	Pondera	Montana	$22,256	$41,277	$52,698	6,166	2,302
1755	Orleans	New York	$22,255	$48,502	$58,031	42,663	15,725
1756	Tooele	Utah	$22,252	$61,412	$66,201	59,120	18,281
1757	Boyle	Kentucky	$22,249	$41,473	$49,654	28,701	11,100
1758	Harding	South Dakota	$22,247	$44,353	$56,354	1,330	527
1759	Pike	Indiana	$22,245	$40,680	$50,069	12,780	5,149
1760	Keokuk	Iowa	$22,243	$42,167	$54,323	10,428	4,354
1761	Sevier	Tennessee	$22,242	$43,649	$50,704	91,295	36,815
1762	Coos	Oregon	$22,239	$37,940	$47,830	62,753	26,072
1763	Henry	Tennessee	$22,239	$36,950	$48,836	32,293	13,473
1764	Greene	Indiana	$22,235	$43,980	$54,728	33,001	12,894
1765	Rosebud	Montana	$22,229	$48,789	$60,188	9,310	3,268
1766	Klickitat	Washington	$22,229	$41,694	$48,375	20,537	8,019
1767	Sabine	Louisiana	$22,229	$35,159	$46,816	24,286	9,175
1768	Morrow	Ohio	$22,228	$51,484	$58,660	34,932	12,940
1769	Haskell	Texas	$22,223	$36,857	$48,886	5,885	2,425
1770	Lewis	Washington	$22,212	$42,860	$53,627	75,419	29,527
1771	Davis	Iowa	$22,210	$45,040	$51,772	8,755	3,115
1772	Kay	Oklahoma	$22,207	$41,012	$50,266	46,122	18,357
1773	La Paz	Arizona	$22,200	$35,776	$42,729	20,408	10,221
1774	St. Lawrence	New York	$22,198	$43,647	$53,346	112,097	41,839
1775	Adams	Wisconsin	$22,196	$44,897	$51,949	20,741	8,278
1776	Somerset	Pennsylvania	$22,192	$43,597	$54,418	77,341	29,791
1777	Pike	Georgia	$22,191	$53,865	$61,309	17,807	6,140
1778	Humphreys	Tennessee	$22,183	$42,846	$54,492	18,392	7,396
1779	Las Animas	Colorado	$22,180	$42,261	$53,089	15,136	5,992
Arkansas			$22,170	$40,768	$50,759	2,933,369	1,129,723
1780	Lawrence	Indiana	$22,169	$42,627	$52,567	46,053	18,592
1781	Chautauqua	New York	$22,168	$42,429	$52,854	134,156	54,863
1782	St. Martin	Louisiana	$22,164	$42,186	$54,589	52,559	18,756
1783	Boone	Arkansas	$22,160	$38,506	$47,585	37,099	15,086
1784	Clearwater	Minnesota	$22,157	$43,269	$52,661	8,725	3,586
1785	Union	Georgia	$22,156	$40,009	$47,736	21,399	9,141
1786	McCormick	South Carolina	$22,150	$40,028	$48,283	10,091	4,069
1787	Glenn	California	$22,148	$43,023	$51,705	28,054	9,628
1788	Anderson	Kansas	$22,139	$41,713	$54,962	8,021	3,308
1789	Hopkins	Kentucky	$22,132	$40,891	$51,596	46,810	18,495
1790	Wayne	Iowa	$22,127	$40,024	$52,447	6,382	2,589
1791	Rapides	Louisiana	$22,126	$40,930	$51,092	132,034	47,606
1792	Lyon	Kentucky	$22,123	$40,112	$55,125	8,394	3,294
1793	Huron	Michigan	$22,120	$40,204	$50,996	32,751	13,907
1794	East Feliciana	Louisiana	$22,099	$47,225	$54,664	20,111	6,991
1795	Chenango	New York	$22,097	$43,941	$54,395	50,121	19,829
1796	Knox	Illinois	$22,093	$40,667	$52,496	52,545	21,481
1797	Garfield	Nebraska	$22,092	$41,892	$49,904	1,947	864
1798	Franklin	Maine	$22,083	$41,626	$50,251	30,660	12,098
1799	Anderson	South Carolina	$22,081	$41,579	$53,856	188,480	73,296
1800	Clay	North Carolina	$22,081	$38,828	$46,528	10,599	4,431
1801	Seneca	Ohio	$22,075	$43,764	$54,219	56,376	21,651
1802	Marengo	Alabama	$22,072	$35,079	$48,116	20,669	8,464
1803	Trimble	Kentucky	$22,070	$49,718	$57,174	8,818	3,512
1804	Furnas	Nebraska	$22,068	$39,603	$51,458	4,920	2,215
1805	Texas County	Oklahoma	$22,064	$49,901	$57,713	21,157	7,180
1806	Lincoln	Missouri	$22,063	$52,835	$59,074	53,051	18,714
1807	Venango	Pennsylvania	$22,060	$41,977	$51,925	54,590	22,547
1808	Ripley	Indiana	$22,059	$47,537	$59,022	28,636	10,761
1809	White	Georgia	$22,059	$40,670	$51,282	27,400	11,788
1810	Lake	Oregon	$22,056	$33,611	$47,537	7,862	3,566
1811	Deer Lodge	Montana	$22,052	$38,958	$49,714	9,285	3,855
1812	Cattaraugus	New York	$22,049	$42,603	$52,637	79,735	32,246
1813	Massac	Illinois	$22,047	$43,615	$55,256	15,282	6,053
1814	Perry	Arkansas	$22,047	$42,455	$50,840	10,381	3,903
1815	Iosco	Michigan	$22,047	$36,236	$45,265	25,662	11,172
1816	Decatur	Indiana	$22,046	$48,047	$54,432	25,939	9,792
1817	Greenup	Kentucky	$22,035	$44,060	$53,746	36,822	14,465
1818	Cherokee	Alabama	$22,030	$34,907	$45,998	26,034	11,656
1819	Clinton	Ohio	$22,026	$46,048	$54,413	42,013	15,969
1820	Maries	Missouri	$22,026	$42,566	$55,331	9,102	3,749
1821	Edwards	Texas	$22,015	$43,839	$54,440	2,070	838
1822	Marion	Oregon	$22,001	$46,885	$54,920	318,441	113,285
1823	Henderson	Texas	$21,995	$40,900	$48,789	78,636	29,732
1824	Marion	Florida	$21,992	$39,453	$46,538	333,503	134,002
1825	Meade	Kansas	$21,990	$51,000	$54,093	4,486	1,714
1826	Garfield	Utah	$21,989	$45,357	$50,429	5,123	1,890
1827	Stevens	Washington	$21,986	$41,742	$52,410	43,513	17,684
1828	Hockley	Texas	$21,984	$50,565	$61,002	23,115	7,973
1829	Randolph	Illinois	$21,976	$47,427	$60,224	33,218	11,889
1830	Coles	Illinois	$21,970	$37,040	$53,465	53,732	21,046
1831	Tuscarawas	Ohio	$21,966	$43,739	$52,496	92,528	36,149
1832	Pittsburg	Oklahoma	$21,966	$41,252	$50,907	45,417	18,456
1833	Buchanan	Missouri	$21,961	$44,363	$57,326	89,419	33,331
1834	Hamilton	Illinois	$21,960	$38,417	$56,202	8,413	3,512
1835	Alpena	Michigan	$21,948	$38,016	$48,308	29,399	12,899
1836	Noble	Oklahoma	$21,947	$44,842	$55,018	11,529	4,565
1837	Rains	Texas	$21,946	$44,478	$55,233	10,989	4,232
1838	Pickett	Tennessee	$21,942	$35,184	$42,159	5,095	2,388
1839	Ashland	Ohio	$21,940	$46,548	$55,342	53,234	20,207
1840	Pueblo	Colorado	$21,940	$41,777	$52,705	160,048	62,439
1841	Sherman	Texas	$21,936	$48,185	$58,977	3,048	949
1842	Marshall	Indiana	$21,933	$45,709	$57,613	47,057	17,581
1843	Richland	Ohio	$21,932	$41,835	$53,602	123,387	48,458
1844	Brule	South Dakota	$21,928	$45,284	$57,078	5,286	2,094
1845	Henry	Alabama	$21,924	$41,650	$54,725	17,308	7,001
1846	Henry	Kentucky	$21,923	$46,016	$53,557	15,425	6,008
1847	Van Zandt	Texas	$21,920	$43,439	$51,707	52,515	19,064
1848	Ouachita	Louisiana	$21,917	$38,955	$50,992	154,641	57,551
1849	Atchison	Kansas	$21,909	$45,212	$56,271	16,839	6,216
1850	Marion	Missouri	$21,909	$42,046	$52,844	28,804	11,203
1851	Donley	Texas	$21,904	$42,411	$57,961	3,620	1,280
1852	Lake of the Woods	Minnesota	$21,903	$44,069	$49,816	3,998	1,665
1853	Clarion	Pennsylvania	$21,902	$42,389	$54,945	39,720	15,776
1854	Noble	Indiana	$21,889	$47,117	$57,363	47,509	17,722
1855	Spartanburg	South Carolina	$21,889	$42,919	$52,662	286,789	107,350
1856	Lincoln	Oklahoma	$21,888	$42,668	$53,457	34,238	13,256
1857	Marion	Illinois	$21,887	$41,010	$52,408	39,070	15,893
1858	Clinton	Pennsylvania	$21,875	$42,184	$55,818	39,501	15,067
1859	Murray	Oklahoma	$21,870	$44,151	$53,246	13,571	5,121
1860	Douglas	Oregon	$21,870	$40,524	$48,420	107,286	43,846
1861	Watauga	North Carolina	$21,854	$34,293	$60,066	51,557	20,909
1862	Bear Lake	Idaho	$21,853	$44,964	$49,145	5,957	2,442
1863	Wirt	West Virginia	$21,852	$34,702	$43,795	5,796	2,427
1864	Kit Carson	Colorado	$21,850	$44,157	$57,538	8,189	3,046
1865	Jackson	Wisconsin	$21,849	$44,149	$51,692	20,506	8,112
1866	Brown	Nebraska	$21,843	$33,647	$44,605	3,167	1,544
1867	Nye	Nevada	$21,838	$39,876	$45,798	43,368	18,046
1868	Raleigh	West Virginia	$21,837	$40,758	$49,936	78,993	31,364
1869	Warren	Illinois	$21,832	$43,536	$53,887	17,762	6,972
1870	Gasconade	Missouri	$21,830	$41,392	$52,579	15,083	6,168
1871	Camas	Idaho	$21,830	$41,154	$46,587	1,267	464
1872	Grays Harbor	Washington	$21,828	$42,405	$52,948	72,092	27,396
1873	Greene	Pennsylvania	$21,819	$44,388	$55,745	38,362	14,417
1874	Piscataquis	Maine	$21,818	$36,646	$45,917	17,343	7,769
1875	Floyd	Virginia	$21,816	$44,618	$50,969	15,371	6,086
1876	Lincoln	Tennessee	$21,811	$41,571	$51,120	33,411	13,438
1877	Madison	Kentucky	$21,800	$42,312	$54,652	83,976	31,484
1878	Lee	Mississippi	$21,799	$42,074	$54,292	83,964	31,898
1879	Wakulla	Florida	$21,797	$52,691	$59,910	30,824	10,455
1880	White	Arkansas	$21,793	$42,487	$51,449	77,767	29,632
1881	Josephine	Oregon	$21,791	$37,733	$46,913	82,783	34,390
1882	Carroll	Ohio	$21,783	$43,779	$52,336	28,689	11,107
1883	Chase	Kansas	$21,775	$36,815	$56,346	2,763	1,149
1884	Woodson	Kansas	$21,774	$33,839	$47,159	3,278	1,517
1885	Galax City	Virginia	$21,769	$30,325	$47,297	6,977	3,018
1886	Lyon	Nevada	$21,757	$46,137	$52,918	51,648	19,278
40%	40th Percentile		$21,750				
1887	Butte	South Dakota	$21,744	$41,332	$58,006	10,197	4,015
1888	Assumption	Louisiana	$21,743	$46,116	$55,603	23,268	8,571
1889	Crawford	Pennsylvania	$21,741	$42,504	$53,099	88,173	34,831
1890	Gray	Texas	$21,738	$43,504	$54,327	22,777	8,388
1891	Chouteau	Montana	$21,737	$40,070	$50,111	5,827	2,228
1892	Stone	Missouri	$21,733	$40,850	$49,527	31,817	13,320
1893	Van Buren	Michigan	$21,732	$45,129	$54,472	75,897	28,374
1894	West Feliciana	Louisiana	$21,720	$61,616	$75,613	15,522	4,007
1895	Box Elder	Utah	$21,720	$57,292	$62,898	50,160	16,207
1896	Brazos	Texas	$21,720	$38,310	$58,863	197,642	70,239
1897	Greenbrier	West Virginia	$21,720	$37,895	$48,487	35,588	15,409
1898	Union	Illinois	$21,719	$41,848	$48,879	17,722	6,852
1899	Lincoln	Montana	$21,719	$33,333	$44,111	19,581	8,872
1900	Stanton	Kansas	$21,712	$46,382	$50,948	2,210	775
1901	Robertson	Texas	$21,709	$40,601	$48,008	16,574	5,851
1902	Grant	Wisconsin	$21,705	$46,963	$58,869	51,080	19,420
1903	Stewart	Tennessee	$21,701	$39,781	$51,250	13,313	5,292
1904	Cass	Indiana	$21,700	$41,940	$50,753	38,802	14,827
1905	Catoosa	Georgia	$21,690	$47,087	$55,768	64,606	23,941
1906	Dade	Georgia	$21,690	$43,205	$50,830	16,580	6,325
1907	Erath	Texas	$21,670	$39,586	$52,201	38,744	14,383
1908	Stanislaus	California	$21,663	$49,297	$55,432	518,321	166,883
1909	McLennan	Texas	$21,660	$41,922	$53,085	237,316	84,862
1910	Floyd	Texas	$21,655	$42,279	$54,696	6,371	2,457
1911	Wetzel	West Virginia	$21,653	$37,969	$49,622	16,435	6,903
1912	Bradley	Tennessee	$21,649	$41,083	$50,351	100,070	37,603
1913	Pulaski	Indiana	$21,641	$44,764	$53,822	13,253	5,058
1914	Rusk	Texas	$21,640	$45,752	$55,414	53,508	17,772
1915	Lynn	Texas	$21,639	$44,375	$49,308	5,841	2,179
1916	Beaufort	North Carolina	$21,636	$40,429	$49,574	47,575	19,266
1917	Finney	Kansas	$21,629	$47,945	$56,111	36,920	12,515
1918	Juniata	Pennsylvania	$21,628	$46,163	$54,701	24,737	9,248
1919	Boone	West Virginia	$21,627	$42,156	$54,315	24,517	9,559
1920	Beltrami	Minnesota	$21,622	$43,231	$53,549	45,021	16,781
1921	Lake and Peninsula	Alaska	$21,616	$51,786	$53,828	1,454	508
1922	Hopkins	Texas	$21,606	$43,657	$52,124	35,295	13,303
1923	DeKalb	Tennessee	$21,606	$37,482	$44,208	18,875	7,037
1924	Appanoose	Iowa	$21,599	$39,208	$51,142	12,808	5,534
1925	Howard	Missouri	$21,598	$42,747	$54,167	10,184	3,825
1926	Avery	North Carolina	$21,598	$36,969	$46,847	17,756	7,122
1927	Saline	Illinois	$21,596	$37,800	$47,023	24,950	10,174
1928	Jefferson	Oregon	$21,593	$43,373	$46,040	21,461	7,882
1929	Randolph	Indiana	$21,592	$40,904	$47,682	25,975	10,429
1930	Newberry	South Carolina	$21,591	$41,718	$53,963	37,514	14,254
1931	Ontonagon	Michigan	$21,585	$34,620	$44,986	6,584	3,269
1932	Pittsylvania	Virginia	$21,583	$42,143	$52,071	63,077	26,092
1933	Colusa	California	$21,579	$52,158	$56,830	21,366	6,853
1934	Franklin	New York	$21,575	$45,667	$54,399	51,676	19,238
1935	Columbiana	Ohio	$21,575	$42,300	$53,267	107,078	42,095
1936	Gaines	Texas	$21,572	$52,910	$56,868	18,019	5,437
1937	Colbert	Alabama	$21,572	$39,077	$50,924	54,456	22,260
1938	Aroostook	Maine	$21,566	$37,855	$50,779	71,230	30,597
1939	Wayne	North Carolina	$21,557	$41,731	$51,391	123,382	47,330
1940	Adams	Idaho	$21,555	$35,434	$42,978	3,937	1,707
1941	Clinton	Indiana	$21,554	$48,953	$57,960	33,086	11,745
1942	Johnson	Missouri	$21,547	$47,223	$58,641	53,517	20,092
1943	Dickson	Tennessee	$21,547	$44,318	$51,398	49,926	18,647
1944	DeSoto	Louisiana	$21,547	$39,162	$51,734	26,813	10,270
1945	Cumberland	Virginia	$21,540	$40,557	$49,351	9,943	4,049
1946	Lake	California	$21,537	$36,548	$48,323	64,260	26,505
1947	Sedgwick	Colorado	$21,536	$40,221	$53,500	2,376	943
1948	Essex	Virginia	$21,532	$44,885	$53,946	11,180	4,286
1949	Burleson	Texas	$21,529	$45,651	$56,139	17,201	6,258
1950	Madison	Indiana	$21,527	$43,120	$54,074	131,027	50,637
1951	Jefferson	Indiana	$21,524	$43,795	$52,922	32,449	12,668
1952	Fayette	Illinois	$21,523	$44,722	$52,735	22,088	8,124
1953	Lake	Montana	$21,521	$38,019	$50,222	28,905	11,829
1954	Putnam	Indiana	$21,520	$50,821	$59,037	37,799	12,414
1955	Cowley	Kansas	$21,519	$41,878	$53,091	36,232	13,867
1956	Somerset	Maine	$21,513	$38,642	$50,051	51,942	21,692
1957	Linn	Oregon	$21,500	$46,939	$55,169	117,648	44,722
1958	Carlisle	Kentucky	$21,500	$39,049	$47,667	5,064	2,034
1959	Loup	Nebraska	$21,499	$38,125	$42,917	581	240
1960	Iron	Michigan	$21,499	$34,685	$46,502	11,723	5,289
1961	Dillingham Census Area	Alaska	$21,498	$54,150	$56,089	4,923	1,339
1962	Craig	Virginia	$21,498	$47,806	$58,750	5,199	2,122
1963	Crawford	Michigan	$21,492	$40,295	$50,114	14,017	5,781
1964	Calloway	Kentucky	$21,490	$39,677	$56,752	37,383	14,937
1965	Klamath	Oregon	$21,489	$39,627	$48,896	66,211	27,378
1966	Monroe	Ohio	$21,487	$40,573	$46,632	14,646	6,111
1967	Scott	Virginia	$21,485	$38,355	$47,067	22,940	9,692
1968	Newton	Georgia	$21,484	$50,580	$56,113	100,808	33,840
1969	McIntosh	Georgia	$21,484	$39,068	$54,036	14,142	4,993
1970	Caldwell	Missouri	$21,482	$41,169	$53,186	9,249	3,743
1971	Crawford	Ohio	$21,478	$40,783	$49,718	43,348	17,655
1972	Carter	Oklahoma	$21,476	$41,401	$52,415	47,904	17,411
1973	Sherman	Kansas	$21,476	$38,634	$46,154	6,063	2,727
1974	Clay	Indiana	$21,474	$46,430	$57,826	26,865	10,230
1975	Washington County	Utah	$21,472	$49,279	$55,881	141,902	46,826
1976	Lamar	Texas	$21,468	$40,104	$50,524	49,751	19,416
1977	Northwest Arctic	Alaska	$21,461	$61,607	$57,866	7,624	1,828
1978	Preston	West Virginia	$21,457	$45,413	$52,128	33,666	12,697
1979	Cotton	Oklahoma	$21,452	$46,317	$56,721	6,166	2,345
1980	Lee	North Carolina	$21,449	$44,819	$55,582	58,735	21,204
1981	Logan	Illinois	$21,445	$47,133	$62,765	30,177	10,963
1982	Troup	Georgia	$21,443	$41,161	$50,076	67,776	24,441
1983	Red River	Louisiana	$21,443	$39,346	$46,024	9,028	3,320
1984	Oxford	Maine	$21,441	$40,674	$49,920	57,657	22,890
1985	Lynchburg City	Virginia	$21,440	$38,138	$50,676	76,467	28,556
1986	Tallapoosa	Alabama	$21,434	$39,130	$46,839	41,428	16,373
1987	Harrison	Kentucky	$21,424	$36,048	$51,177	18,693	7,179
1988	Webster	Nebraska	$21,423	$41,045	$49,968	3,762	1,548
1989	Daviess	Indiana	$21,416	$47,165	$56,684	31,928	11,160
1990	Pine	Minnesota	$21,413	$43,928	$53,869	29,449	11,758
1991	Hernando	Florida	$21,411	$41,024	$48,461	173,119	70,210
1992	Geary	Kansas	$21,408	$46,908	$51,712	35,583	12,532
1993	Mitchell	North Carolina	$21,404	$37,680	$46,432	15,453	6,455
1994	Franklin	North Carolina	$21,399	$41,696	$51,353	61,154	23,313
1995	Marion	Tennessee	$21,399	$41,268	$49,631	28,214	11,226
1996	Vernon	Louisiana	$21,396	$46,572	$51,718	52,510	18,148
1997	Yoakum	Texas	$21,389	$49,340	$55,545	7,998	2,654
1998	Lafayette	Mississippi	$21,388	$43,328	$59,882	48,905	15,743
1999	Colfax	New Mexico	$21,387	$37,734	$47,100	13,485	5,574
2000	Barrow	Georgia	$21,379	$53,274	$58,892	69,933	23,413
2001	Hill	Montana	$21,376	$43,726	$55,617	16,301	6,139
2002	Crittenden	Kentucky	$21,375	$34,261	$48,083	9,283	3,794
2003	Washington County	Indiana	$21,370	$41,986	$50,107	28,064	10,631
2004	Van Buren	Iowa	$21,368	$43,181	$54,591	7,517	3,023
2005	Lawrence	Ohio	$21,365	$41,552	$53,015	62,309	24,009
U.S. Virgin Islands			$21,362	$37,254	$45,058	106,405	43,214
2006	Tazewell	Virginia	$21,358	$35,693	$45,080	44,664	18,294
2007	Williams	Ohio	$21,350	$43,089	$52,347	37,623	14,947
2008	Lauderdale	Mississippi	$21,346	$36,203	$46,954	80,337	29,809
2009	Pike	Illinois	$21,344	$39,845	$49,542	16,337	6,708
2010	Crenshaw	Alabama	$21,343	$36,275	$48,903	13,955	5,601
2011	Garrard	Kentucky	$21,341	$44,652	$55,105	16,896	6,302
2012	St. John the Baptist	Louisiana	$21,335	$50,635	$56,540	45,139	15,440
2013	Baxter	Arkansas	$21,334	$35,343	$45,499	41,281	18,155
2014	Taos	New Mexico	$21,333	$32,637	$44,541	32,899	13,338
2015	San Bernardino	California	$21,332	$54,090	$59,294	2,056,915	603,879
2016	Montgomery	Kansas	$21,332	$39,669	$52,583	34,869	14,000
2017	Bannock	Idaho	$21,327	$43,534	$57,079	83,091	30,271
2018	Owen	Indiana	$21,318	$43,950	$51,503	21,467	8,552
2019	Gilmer	Georgia	$21,317	$39,140	$44,624	28,308	11,513
2020	St. Mary	Louisiana	$21,313	$41,571	$48,754	54,078	20,092
2021	Pleasants	West Virginia	$21,312	$41,859	$57,604	7,602	2,747
2022	Stokes	North Carolina	$21,311	$42,703	$50,910	47,063	18,969
2023	Ross	Ohio	$21,310	$43,264	$52,836	77,802	28,308
2024	Jefferson	Pennsylvania	$21,300	$41,262	$51,451	45,015	18,503
2025	Jasper	Georgia	$21,297	$42,192	$49,194	13,748	5,132
2026	Person	North Carolina	$21,292	$42,317	$49,521	39,361	15,320
2027	Polk	Florida	$21,285	$43,113	$50,944	610,295	219,540
2028	Garvin	Oklahoma	$21,285	$38,245	$47,330	27,410	10,294
2029	Clearfield	Pennsylvania	$21,273	$41,030	$51,031	81,536	32,192
2030	Tangipahoa	Louisiana	$21,273	$40,654	$53,101	122,665	44,418
2031	Hamblen	Tennessee	$21,261	$39,596	$50,162	62,721	24,315
2032	San Juan	New Mexico	$21,260	$48,196	$57,715	128,476	40,945
2033	Curry	New Mexico	$21,259	$39,871	$50,963	49,302	18,027
2034	Pendleton	West Virginia	$21,253	$34,175	$47,745	7,603	3,274
2035	Milam	Texas	$21,248	$37,391	$49,860	24,503	9,330
2036	Chautauqua	Kansas	$21,245	$39,529	$45,221	3,614	1,565
2037	Brown	Texas	$21,236	$39,776	$48,865	37,942	13,405
2038	Carroll	Georgia	$21,227	$46,147	$54,942	111,160	39,494
2039	Fulton	Indiana	$21,226	$40,168	$47,724	20,698	8,221
2040	Vermilion	Illinois	$21,225	$41,400	$51,986	81,147	31,575
2041	Pawnee	Oklahoma	$21,220	$44,375	$56,131	16,592	6,341
2042	New Madrid	Missouri	$21,215	$35,793	$45,048	18,695	7,423
2043	Allegany	Maryland	$21,211	$39,293	$54,022	74,394	28,433
2044	Dyer	Tennessee	$21,208	$38,953	$47,037	38,239	15,100
2045	Whitman	Washington	$21,208	$36,257	$63,713	45,512	16,624
2046	Brown	Ohio	$21,206	$44,341	$51,674	44,604	16,380
2047	Wabash	Indiana	$21,201	$45,286	$52,204	32,650	12,703
2048	Terry	Texas	$21,201	$37,679	$45,765	12,644	4,067
2049	Modoc	California	$21,200	$36,212	$46,268	9,468	3,983
2050	Vigo	Indiana	$21,192	$40,692	$52,203	108,084	39,597
2051	Gates	North Carolina	$21,187	$46,592	$53,577	11,982	4,459
2052	Jefferson	Florida	$21,184	$44,170	$51,029	14,469	5,347
2053	Pickens	South Carolina	$21,182	$41,788	$54,279	119,483	43,971
2054	Hill	Texas	$21,182	$40,769	$52,184	35,051	13,395
2055	Iberville	Louisiana	$21,177	$45,368	$54,191	33,360	11,192
2056	Lewis	West Virginia	$21,175	$36,199	$44,653	16,411	6,451
2057	Phelps	Missouri	$21,173	$41,964	$54,015	44,969	16,699
2058	Gallia	Ohio	$21,168	$39,226	$48,918	30,859	11,576
2059	Neosho	Kansas	$21,163	$42,071	$49,915	16,477	6,508
2060	Smith	Tennessee	$21,153	$42,383	$52,301	19,134	7,263
2061	Cumberland	Tennessee	$21,141	$37,188	$43,611	56,589	23,764
2062	Dawes	Nebraska	$21,137	$40,359	$62,952	9,172	3,709
2063	Jefferson Davis	Louisiana	$21,132	$41,622	$51,772	31,498	11,634
2064	Lucas	Iowa	$21,126	$43,288	$55,547	8,840	3,734
2065	Tucker	West Virginia	$21,126	$37,635	$49,677	7,061	3,050
2066	Shelby	Texas	$21,126	$37,081	$44,129	25,677	9,781
2067	Eastland	Texas	$21,125	$34,914	$44,271	18,465	6,872
2068	Jasper	Missouri	$21,124	$40,399	$49,154	116,803	44,849
2069	Ashland	Wisconsin	$21,115	$38,550	$47,587	16,068	6,775
2070	Wayne	Indiana	$21,114	$38,350	$48,417	68,557	28,185
2071	Elkhart	Indiana	$21,109	$45,693	$53,154	198,662	70,130
2072	Delaware County	Oklahoma	$21,109	$36,588	$45,708	41,394	16,589
2073	Rockingham	North Carolina	$21,102	$38,567	$47,715	92,974	37,693
2074	Cottle	Texas	$21,089	$34,639	$39,241	1,546	709
2075	Onslow	North Carolina	$21,084	$45,450	$49,819	179,935	60,071
2076	Grenada	Mississippi	$21,084	$34,129	$48,301	21,745	7,941
2077	Greenwood	South Carolina	$21,053	$36,540	$47,807	69,727	27,004
2078	Knox	Indiana	$21,047	$42,119	$53,840	38,266	14,738
2079	Bates	Missouri	$21,047	$38,579	$50,469	16,878	6,832
2080	Brown	Kansas	$21,046	$39,968	$52,456	9,969	4,104
2081	Comanche	Kansas	$21,041	$39,375	$55,431	1,905	791
2082	Hocking	Ohio	$21,037	$42,089	$52,837	29,268	11,478
2083	Harrison	Ohio	$21,029	$39,002	$48,739	15,766	6,395
2084	Morgan	Ohio	$21,027	$37,865	$44,902	15,008	6,204
2085	Bartow	Georgia	$21,022	$47,197	$56,223	100,382	34,567
2086	Live Oak	Texas	$21,016	$42,829	$49,681	11,603	3,882
2087	Linn	Missouri	$21,015	$38,250	$47,327	12,592	4,854
2088	Jackson	North Carolina	$21,014	$36,951	$48,568	40,362	15,609
2089	Livingston	Missouri	$21,011	$40,116	$54,663	15,051	5,660
2090	Rusk	Wisconsin	$21,004	$38,658	$47,825	14,571	6,430
2091	Lancaster	South Carolina	$21,003	$42,217	$51,067	77,946	28,956
2092	Butte	Idaho	$20,995	$41,131	$50,000	2,786	1,022
2093	Montgomery	Missouri	$20,991	$40,236	$48,314	12,128	5,091
2094	Angelina	Texas	$20,982	$41,354	$47,396	87,042	30,668
2095	Bibb	Georgia	$20,982	$37,550	$49,891	155,524	56,585
2096	Allegany	New York	$20,978	$42,445	$52,112	48,618	18,786
2097	Crawford	Kansas	$20,974	$37,378	$50,936	39,182	15,370
2098	Wilson	North Carolina	$20,972	$39,204	$47,796	81,365	31,690
2099	Lowndes	Mississippi	$20,951	$37,868	$48,662	59,746	23,178
2100	Knox	Missouri	$20,946	$34,481	$44,073	4,099	1,724
2101	Bon Homme	South Dakota	$20,941	$40,980	$55,508	7,048	2,501
2102	Pottawatomie	Oklahoma	$20,937	$42,764	$51,656	70,144	25,658
2103	Perry	Indiana	$20,934	$47,596	$57,732	19,450	7,411
2104	Halifax	Virginia	$20,929	$34,659	$45,024	35,938	14,770
2105	Bracken	Kentucky	$20,918	$39,196	$55,526	8,472	3,252
2106	Rowan	North Carolina	$20,912	$41,495	$50,537	138,265	52,300
2107	Pinal	Arizona	$20,910	$50,027	$55,282	379,128	123,733
2108	Lumpkin	Georgia	$20,908	$43,775	$56,826	30,428	10,999
2109	Obion	Tennessee	$20,900	$39,467	$46,784	31,566	12,462
2110	Sequatchie	Tennessee	$20,899	$36,434	$49,238	14,333	5,616
2111	Meade	Kentucky	$20,898	$46,756	$50,574	29,028	10,342
2112	Edwards	Illinois	$20,898	$39,075	$49,290	6,695	2,728
2113	Schoolcraft	Michigan	$20,892	$35,260	$47,557	8,407	3,590
2114	Essex	Vermont	$20,887	$35,916	$45,000	6,276	2,774
2115	Fayette	Pennsylvania	$20,884	$39,115	$49,664	136,145	54,363
2116	Union	Indiana	$20,883	$44,161	$57,330	7,420	2,943
2117	Crook	Oregon	$20,883	$38,795	$48,486	20,894	8,880
2118	Richmond County	Virginia	$20,875	$47,083	$68,487	9,140	2,853
2119	Payne	Oklahoma	$20,868	$36,812	$56,881	77,897	30,010
2120	Walker	Georgia	$20,865	$39,963	$50,683	68,481	26,191
2121	Harney	Oregon	$20,865	$38,113	$42,540	7,314	3,113
2122	Pulaski	Missouri	$20,863	$49,820	$56,933	52,795	15,747
2123	Esmeralda	Nevada	$20,862	$30,284	$51,500	979	479
2124	Martin	Texas	$20,859	$42,607	$49,643	4,956	1,555
2125	Delaware County	Indiana	$20,854	$37,474	$51,591	117,575	46,325
2126	Taylor	West Virginia	$20,848	$39,536	$48,618	16,906	6,878
2127	Ashe	North Carolina	$20,838	$35,951	$47,184	27,180	11,839
2128	Smyth	Virginia	$20,837	$37,239	$46,776	31,979	12,650
2129	Umatilla	Oregon	$20,836	$48,389	$57,434	76,306	26,744
2130	Mohave	Arizona	$20,833	$39,200	$47,136	201,680	80,230
2131	Calhoun	Alabama	$20,828	$39,962	$50,851	117,714	45,196
2132	Scott	Missouri	$20,825	$40,651	$48,705	39,216	15,169
2133	Washington County	Maine	$20,807	$37,236	$45,117	32,621	14,209
2134	Natchitoches	Louisiana	$20,802	$33,953	$47,936	39,403	14,903
2135	Mifflin	Pennsylvania	$20,794	$40,384	$48,222	46,698	18,711
2136	Gila	Arizona	$20,792	$39,954	$48,958	53,335	20,601
2137	Liberty	Georgia	$20,791	$43,832	$48,756	64,899	23,046
2138	Muskingum	Ohio	$20,775	$40,524	$50,977	85,872	33,976
2139	Utah County	Utah	$20,774	$60,196	$65,542	529,262	143,005
2140	Tuscola	Michigan	$20,767	$43,039	$51,319	55,172	21,211
2141	Cullman	Alabama	$20,760	$38,847	$47,103	80,499	31,342
2142	Clark	Wisconsin	$20,754	$43,276	$53,025	34,630	13,036
2143	Edgefield	South Carolina	$20,753	$43,861	$53,879	26,698	9,108
2144	Graves	Kentucky	$20,746	$38,394	$50,693	37,329	14,419
2145	Costilla	Colorado	$20,742	$29,145	$41,551	3,552	1,361
2146	Huntingdon	Pennsylvania	$20,739	$44,183	$54,961	45,874	17,193
2147	Marshall	Tennessee	$20,739	$42,291	$51,921	30,818	11,578
2148	Hooker	Nebraska	$20,737	$39,327	$42,366	703	295
2149	Okanogan	Washington	$20,735	$40,368	$47,539	41,143	15,980
2150	Blount	Alabama	$20,730	$44,145	$52,996	57,623	21,108
2151	Saguache	Colorado	$20,726	$34,600	$41,154	6,200	2,692
2152	Phillips	Colorado	$20,720	$43,011	$54,583	4,383	1,668
2153	Union	Arkansas	$20,718	$37,435	$46,952	41,307	16,596
2154	Sanilac	Michigan	$20,713	$40,478	$50,648	42,637	16,329
2155	Tyler	West Virginia	$20,704	$39,206	$47,671	9,120	3,712
2156	Chilton	Alabama	$20,701	$41,250	$52,092	43,744	16,232
2157	Walker	Alabama	$20,698	$37,566	$46,245	66,622	25,751
2158	Briscoe	Texas	$20,697	$36,250	$50,560	1,615	605
2159	Morgan	Colorado	$20,680	$43,774	$50,202	28,308	10,446
2160	Barton	Missouri	$20,678	$40,580	$49,713	12,378	5,065
2161	McCulloch	Texas	$20,677	$39,194	$50,653	8,302	2,967
2162	Pulaski	Kentucky	$20,667	$34,092	$44,363	63,369	26,108
2163	Morrow	Oregon	$20,663	$49,940	$52,652	11,218	3,741
2164	Hawkins	Tennessee	$20,662	$37,357	$46,066	56,759	23,348
2165	Lawrence	Mississippi	$20,655	$38,393	$49,975	12,734	4,830
2166	Elmore	Idaho	$20,646	$42,842	$49,157	26,528	9,555
2167	Prairie	Montana	$20,644	$38,036	$41,667	1,186	502
2168	Lincoln	Georgia	$20,641	$35,625	$42,909	7,894	3,394
2169	Carroll	Arkansas	$20,637	$36,584	$46,669	27,531	11,019
2170	Miller	Arkansas	$20,636	$41,319	$51,790	43,515	16,950
2171	Lincoln	Louisiana	$20,633	$35,769	$51,206	46,926	16,877
2172	Marion	Ohio	$20,624	$42,572	$53,882	66,323	24,578
2173	Newaygo	Michigan	$20,623	$42,571	$50,181	48,280	18,156
2174	Cleveland	Arkansas	$20,622	$39,420	$47,576	8,648	3,346
2175	Mason	West Virginia	$20,622	$38,411	$44,401	27,271	10,609
2176	Muskegon	Michigan	$20,621	$40,979	$50,092	171,153	65,008
2177	Jefferson	Tennessee	$20,619	$39,745	$49,107	51,759	19,797
Mississippi			$20,618	$39,031	$48,471	2,976,872	1,088,073
2178	Catron	New Mexico	$20,616	$39,826	$45,821	3,683	1,581
2179	Mingo	West Virginia	$20,609	$35,955	$47,986	26,460	10,827
2180	Fayette	Ohio	$20,603	$37,619	$45,108	28,902	11,514
2181	Clay	South Dakota	$20,595	$38,173	$61,750	13,953	5,145
2182	Grayson	Virginia	$20,591	$30,710	$40,245	15,377	6,618
2183	Chippewa	Michigan	$20,589	$41,637	$54,513	38,760	14,605
2184	Twin Falls	Idaho	$20,588	$43,886	$50,795	78,067	28,166
2185	Lyman	South Dakota	$20,586	$47,596	$61,713	3,804	1,423
2186	Mayes	Oklahoma	$20,585	$42,751	$52,749	41,110	15,896
2187	Dickens	Texas	$20,578	$38,401	$53,558	2,382	913
2188	Wexford	Michigan	$20,573	$40,965	$48,790	32,690	12,473
2189	St. Joseph	Michigan	$20,570	$44,051	$52,116	61,111	22,326
2190	Cannon	Tennessee	$20,566	$40,689	$48,333	13,790	5,383
2191	Rio Grande	Colorado	$20,557	$38,993	$45,347	11,913	4,722
2192	Crawford	Georgia	$20,556	$41,586	$48,796	12,607	4,620
2193	Brown	Illinois	$20,555	$42,194	$64,292	6,904	2,105
2194	Allen	Kansas	$20,552	$40,554	$50,344	13,318	5,505
2195	Pearl River	Mississippi	$20,549	$42,510	$50,330	55,569	20,556
2196	Mora	New Mexico	$20,543	$28,481	$41,794	4,788	1,532
2197	Guernsey	Ohio	$20,537	$38,841	$48,708	39,935	15,690
2198	Stephens	Texas	$20,535	$41,728	$50,128	9,493	3,509
2199	Parke	Indiana	$20,534	$43,870	$52,130	17,210	5,893
2200	Gentry	Missouri	$20,534	$39,192	$47,750	6,774	2,800
30%	30th Percentile		$20,530				
2201	Jackson	Illinois	$20,527	$33,479	$52,697	60,055	23,567
2202	Coshocton	Ohio	$20,526	$41,274	$48,818	36,862	14,495
2203	Richmond	Georgia	$20,526	$37,749	$46,486	201,081	72,281
2204	Bryan	Oklahoma	$20,524	$38,897	$47,403	43,079	16,575
2205	Randolph	North Carolina	$20,523	$41,208	$50,234	142,042	54,350
2206	Putnam	Tennessee	$20,517	$33,709	$47,920	72,702	28,980
2207	Greenlee	Arizona	$20,516	$47,992	$48,074	8,679	3,386
2208	Grant	Indiana	$20,516	$39,747	$49,685	69,671	26,981
2209	Stanly	North Carolina	$20,504	$42,518	$54,611	60,529	23,108
2210	Crawford	Indiana	$20,504	$39,700	$46,628	10,656	4,237
2211	Floyd	Georgia	$20,500	$40,821	$50,563	96,147	34,646
2212	Oglethorpe	Georgia	$20,493	$45,729	$57,399	14,730	5,201
2213	Trousdale	Tennessee	$20,491	$43,034	$52,030	7,843	2,899
2214	Shoshone	Idaho	$20,487	$38,440	$47,768	12,729	5,714
2215	Jackson	Alabama	$20,486	$37,634	$47,380	53,171	20,765
2216	Scott	Indiana	$20,481	$42,898	$48,435	24,035	8,914
2217	Miami	Indiana	$20,475	$42,023	$53,154	36,624	13,210
2218	Cloud	Kansas	$20,467	$38,534	$45,688	9,419	4,022
2219	Forest	Wisconsin	$20,462	$39,963	$51,207	9,255	3,739
2220	Jim Wells	Texas	$20,452	$40,585	$47,588	41,217	13,728
2221	Nicholas	Kentucky	$20,450	$43,081	$48,164	7,085	2,884
2222	Henderson	Tennessee	$20,449	$38,280	$47,551	27,934	10,930
2223	Pope	Illinois	$20,448	$38,371	$45,551	4,383	1,736
2224	Hinds	Mississippi	$20,448	$37,626	$47,132	246,300	87,844
2225	Alexander	North Carolina	$20,440	$40,637	$50,123	37,071	14,101
2226	Tehama	California	$20,439	$41,924	$49,018	63,241	23,374
2227	Montgomery	Kentucky	$20,436	$37,312	$45,434	26,762	10,168
2228	Tate	Mississippi	$20,431	$41,494	$51,887	28,625	9,936
2229	Newton	Texas	$20,431	$37,246	$46,690	14,340	4,865
2230	Towns	Georgia	$20,419	$36,570	$45,707	10,551	4,261
2231	Saline	Nebraska	$20,407	$44,109	$53,101	14,348	5,051
2232	Gibson	Tennessee	$20,402	$38,343	$47,987	49,664	19,205
2233	Washington County	Alabama	$20,395	$42,156	$50,376	17,284	6,620
2234	Franklin	Illinois	$20,394	$36,273	$48,376	39,470	16,110
2235	Covington	Alabama	$20,391	$35,869	$43,822	37,847	15,041
2236	Mercer	West Virginia	$20,391	$34,842	$44,751	62,261	25,641
2237	Hopewell City	Virginia	$20,388	$37,933	$47,214	22,429	8,766
2238	Marshall	Alabama	$20,382	$39,526	$48,952	93,699	34,250
2239	Washington County	Idaho	$20,380	$37,453	$46,690	10,094	3,938
2240	Hillsdale	Michigan	$20,379	$41,759	$49,976	46,463	17,642
2241	Wilbarger	Texas	$20,373	$41,658	$45,604	13,371	5,161
2242	Pocahontas	West Virginia	$20,373	$33,779	$43,975	8,723	3,694
2243	Hart	Georgia	$20,371	$35,615	$47,473	25,348	10,009
2244	Gladwin	Michigan	$20,368	$37,626	$45,605	25,664	10,895
2245	Butts	Georgia	$20,363	$49,754	$61,761	23,563	7,776
2246	Scotland	Missouri	$20,363	$39,028	$49,328	4,859	1,915
2247	Nacogdoches	Texas	$20,362	$36,777	$50,952	65,085	23,586
2248	Coffee	Tennessee	$20,357	$37,618	$50,394	53,011	21,019
2249	Sumter	South Carolina	$20,340	$41,366	$48,603	107,645	39,373
2250	Fannin	Texas	$20,337	$44,355	$52,392	33,819	11,814
2251	Webster	Kentucky	$20,337	$41,415	$54,448	13,564	5,150
2252	Marion	Texas	$20,337	$31,967	$46,207	10,439	4,563
2253	Smith	Mississippi	$20,334	$34,753	$44,849	16,414	6,269
2254	Monroe	Missouri	$20,331	$40,657	$53,116	8,798	3,497
2255	Gogebic	Michigan	$20,330	$34,252	$46,570	16,179	7,070
2256	Wadena	Minnesota	$20,329	$36,928	$50,354	13,772	5,830
2257	Navarro	Texas	$20,327	$40,795	$47,493	47,883	17,466
2258	Caldwell	Kentucky	$20,327	$37,127	$48,478	12,946	5,232
2259	Choctaw	Alabama	$20,323	$33,941	$45,876	13,687	5,518
2260	Blackford	Indiana	$20,322	$39,225	$45,310	12,665	5,190
2261	Elk	Kansas	$20,322	$34,089	$43,500	2,782	1,271
2262	Jackson	South Dakota	$20,319	$46,224	$51,196	3,116	1,056
2263	St. Bernard	Louisiana	$20,316	$41,353	$45,087	38,850	13,714
2264	Harnett	North Carolina	$20,310	$44,625	$54,000	118,793	40,677
2265	Wharton	Texas	$20,310	$40,411	$51,702	41,185	14,517
2266	Henry	Indiana	$20,309	$40,679	$51,172	49,275	18,367
2267	Grimes	Texas	$20,307	$43,994	$56,398	26,663	8,848
2268	Missaukee	Michigan	$20,305	$41,061	$47,446	14,940	5,891
2269	Kern	California	$20,295	$48,552	$52,618	848,204	255,271
2270	Monroe	West Virginia	$20,294	$41,234	$46,707	13,512	5,648
2271	Independence	Arkansas	$20,289	$35,026	$44,442	36,786	14,544
2272	Gonzales	Texas	$20,288	$39,248	$45,275	19,920	6,638
2273	Meagher	Montana	$20,288	$38,182	$47,604	1,905	716
2274	Clark	Missouri	$20,279	$40,204	$50,288	7,035	2,749
2275	Polk	Tennessee	$20,274	$39,074	$46,076	16,723	6,740
2276	Nome Census Area	Alaska	$20,271	$49,974	$47,078	9,695	2,797
2277	Kalkaska	Michigan	$20,258	$40,140	$48,153	17,142	7,035
2278	Yancey	North Carolina	$20,257	$38,579	$45,693	17,724	7,278
2279	Fairfield	South Carolina	$20,257	$36,120	$44,842	23,589	9,408
2280	Clearwater	Idaho	$20,256	$40,134	$49,267	8,638	3,545
2281	Jasper	Texas	$20,254	$40,417	$49,398	35,797	13,095
2282	Gem	Idaho	$20,250	$44,432	$49,872	16,722	6,323
2283	Childress	Texas	$20,248	$47,532	$58,160	7,057	2,374
2284	Pecos	Texas	$20,245	$47,019	$58,525	15,590	4,588
2285	Blaine	Oklahoma	$20,242	$44,206	$51,519	10,198	3,815
2286	Runnels	Texas	$20,235	$37,667	$45,546	10,439	3,818
2287	Banks	Georgia	$20,231	$41,141	$51,561	18,333	6,772
2288	Taney	Missouri	$20,231	$38,461	$46,764	52,412	20,698
2289	Surry	North Carolina	$20,219	$35,641	$44,788	73,486	29,967
2290	George	Mississippi	$20,217	$43,958	$53,793	22,757	7,842
2291	Fresno	California	$20,208	$45,563	$50,884	939,605	289,811
2292	Ionia	Michigan	$20,206	$47,892	$54,829	63,909	22,152
2293	Etowah	Alabama	$20,204	$38,013	$47,259	104,260	40,217
2294	Foard	Texas	$20,202	$33,750	$44,152	1,133	491
2295	Oktibbeha	Mississippi	$20,202	$30,987	$55,210	48,198	18,176
2296	Geneva	Alabama	$20,199	$35,625	$43,481	26,791	10,945
2297	Benewah	Idaho	$20,198	$39,049	$41,110	9,186	3,888
2298	Atascosa	Texas	$20,193	$47,543	$53,016	45,714	15,095
2299	Grant	West Virginia	$20,193	$41,368	$51,667	11,869	4,449
2300	Lawrence	Alabama	$20,181	$38,551	$48,486	34,009	13,382
2301	Duval	Texas	$20,181	$34,131	$40,917	11,740	3,901
2302	Gilchrist	Florida	$20,180	$38,406	$46,202	16,917	6,240
2303	Dakota	Nebraska	$20,179	$47,069	$54,721	20,920	7,309
2304	Mercer	Missouri	$20,178	$40,272	$49,087	3,749	1,575
2305	Adams	Indiana	$20,160	$46,695	$56,345	34,424	12,127
2306	Covington City	Virginia	$20,160	$34,319	$45,742	5,880	2,545
2307	Sterling	Texas	$20,157	$50,543	$58,214	1,358	458
2308	Bleckley	Georgia	$20,156	$36,073	$46,594	12,961	3,955
2309	Carbon	Utah	$20,155	$44,724	$59,397	21,227	7,764
2310	Unicoi	Tennessee	$20,152	$32,292	$44,029	18,254	7,601
2311	Delta	Texas	$20,150	$40,375	$52,482	5,237	1,929
2312	Dawson	Nebraska	$20,142	$46,078	$53,214	24,256	8,774
2313	Emery	Utah	$20,137	$52,763	$60,948	10,895	3,598
2314	Hardin	Tennessee	$20,127	$33,622	$41,225	26,011	9,934
2315	Jennings	Indiana	$20,109	$44,128	$51,657	28,324	10,632
2316	Darlington	South Carolina	$20,105	$36,323	$46,150	68,346	26,609
2317	Jones	North Carolina	$20,105	$36,213	$49,041	10,194	4,151
2318	Cass	Texas	$20,104	$35,598	$47,101	30,344	11,836
2319	Cache	Utah	$20,074	$49,506	$57,220	114,181	35,375
2320	Highlands	Florida	$20,072	$35,560	$42,866	98,275	39,931
2321	Pike	Ohio	$20,071	$42,165	$46,476	28,587	10,859
2322	Cleveland	North Carolina	$20,062	$38,989	$48,723	97,670	37,760
2323	Mecklenburg	Virginia	$20,056	$36,261	$49,468	32,274	12,650
2324	Macon	Missouri	$20,054	$38,443	$50,393	15,545	6,389
2325	Ferry	Washington	$20,052	$37,571	$42,164	7,623	2,951
2326	Morris	Texas	$20,045	$37,849	$45,989	12,869	4,949
2327	Chattahoochee	Georgia	$20,042	$48,758	$49,808	12,193	2,613
2328	McDonough	Illinois	$20,042	$36,031	$54,058	32,549	12,620
2329	Conway	Arkansas	$20,040	$35,225	$46,002	21,235	8,154
2330	Arenac	Michigan	$20,039	$38,874	$45,479	15,753	6,363
2331	Dade	Missouri	$20,034	$35,483	$44,175	7,734	3,175
2332	Clark	Idaho	$20,032	$33,200	$33,897	751	304
2333	Switzerland	Indiana	$20,019	$44,143	$48,689	10,534	4,099
2334	Rio Arriba	New Mexico	$20,014	$40,250	$47,363	40,218	14,783
2335	Ashtabula	Ohio	$20,011	$40,516	$50,218	100,835	38,952
2336	Muhlenberg	Kentucky	$20,008	$38,105	$44,874	31,427	11,869
2337	Pierce	Georgia	$20,001	$39,067	$47,747	18,774	6,970
2338	Giles	Tennessee	$19,998	$38,495	$47,011	29,214	11,766
2339	Ford	Kansas	$19,994	$51,178	$57,380	34,217	11,103
2340	McLean	Kentucky	$19,984	$38,833	$47,436	9,524	3,770
2341	Thomas	Georgia	$19,983	$34,035	$42,835	44,692	17,377
2342	Concho	Texas	$19,976	$51,411	$58,654	4,070	857
2343	Millard	Utah	$19,972	$49,238	$59,266	12,543	4,101
2344	Catahoula	Louisiana	$19,970	$36,165	$44,627	10,332	3,767
2345	Grant	Nebraska	$19,968	$44,167	$45,865	614	246
2346	Johnston	Oklahoma	$19,967	$36,192	$39,876	10,982	4,248
2347	Howard	Texas	$19,965	$45,612	$58,661	35,297	11,010
2348	Webster	Missouri	$19,955	$44,596	$50,033	36,274	12,668
2349	Branch	Michigan	$19,947	$41,856	$50,701	44,398	15,862
2350	Madison	Georgia	$19,939	$42,549	$50,554	28,044	9,732
2351	Lassen	California	$19,931	$53,107	$65,616	34,018	9,945
2352	Wilson	Kansas	$19,929	$38,917	$48,174	9,269	3,791
2353	Laurel	Kentucky	$19,923	$36,570	$43,075	59,178	22,931
2354	Pope	Arkansas	$19,918	$40,453	$47,074	62,248	22,603
2355	Montgomery	Illinois	$19,917	$41,952	$54,529	29,878	11,192
2356	Love	Oklahoma	$19,910	$43,260	$50,761	9,496	3,378
2357	Acadia	Louisiana	$19,910	$37,587	$46,159	61,847	22,527
2358	Lewis	Idaho	$19,910	$36,000	$48,894	3,851	1,660
2359	Madison	North Carolina	$19,902	$38,598	$49,806	20,842	8,207
2360	Logan	West Virginia	$19,901	$36,999	$47,700	36,442	14,699
2361	Martinsville City	Virginia	$19,900	$28,116	$40,875	13,808	5,995
2362	Karnes	Texas	$19,899	$42,862	$55,603	14,916	4,497
2363	Daviess	Missouri	$19,890	$42,393	$51,500	8,347	3,151
—	Saint Croix	U.S. Virgin Islands	$19,883	$36,042	$41,959	50,601	19,765
2364	Little River	Arkansas	$19,880	$39,673	$48,406	12,992	5,315
2365	Otero	New Mexico	$19,880	$39,263	$46,828	64,767	23,945
2366	Boundary	Idaho	$19,877	$37,003	$44,390	10,866	4,144
2367	Webster	Louisiana	$19,871	$35,071	$44,436	41,039	15,980
2368	Muskogee	Oklahoma	$19,868	$38,502	$48,251	70,657	26,802
2369	Pulaski	Illinois	$19,867	$33,717	$45,764	6,035	2,419
2370	Potter	Texas	$19,861	$37,951	$46,243	121,526	42,751
2371	Mineral	Montana	$19,859	$33,033	$45,331	4,219	1,629
2372	Wayne	Utah	$19,858	$41,458	$48,125	2,760	970
2373	Baker	Florida	$19,852	$49,236	$58,850	27,069	8,216
2374	Henry	Virginia	$19,852	$34,984	$43,284	53,451	22,690
2375	Franklin	Florida	$19,843	$38,328	$48,661	11,554	4,294
2376	Washington County	Kentucky	$19,837	$40,845	$48,578	11,774	4,480
2377	Randolph	Alabama	$19,830	$35,213	$45,076	22,819	9,013
2378	Grant	Kentucky	$19,829	$46,159	$51,866	24,685	8,334
2379	Hardeman	Texas	$19,829	$36,377	$45,750	4,087	1,745
2380	Desha	Arkansas	$19,822	$28,680	$39,937	12,774	5,305
2381	Sullivan	Indiana	$19,821	$43,510	$55,748	21,321	7,764
2382	Craig	Oklahoma	$19,820	$39,236	$50,231	14,869	5,603
2383	Greene	Tennessee	$19,801	$35,545	$43,400	68,679	28,677
2384	Livingston	Kentucky	$19,795	$40,313	$47,075	9,467	3,569
2385	Haralson	Georgia	$19,789	$39,993	$49,077	28,594	10,806
2386	Lyon	Kansas	$19,789	$38,981	$51,106	33,624	13,170
2387	Mineral	West Virginia	$19,788	$31,163	$48,910	28,015	11,180
2388	Spalding	Georgia	$19,783	$41,534	$50,251	64,011	22,997
2389	Houghton	Michigan	$19,783	$35,430	$52,409	36,494	14,029
2390	Graham	North Carolina	$19,780	$33,903	$39,580	8,762	3,462
2391	Starke	Indiana	$19,773	$40,126	$46,205	23,267	8,964
2392	Christian	Kentucky	$19,773	$38,904	$45,583	74,169	25,899
2393	Moore	Texas	$19,770	$51,181	$53,653	22,029	6,820
2394	Ashley	Arkansas	$19,761	$35,683	$45,612	21,645	8,656
2395	Lenoir	North Carolina	$19,760	$35,770	$45,306	59,277	23,569
2396	Okmulgee	Oklahoma	$19,753	$39,156	$48,720	39,747	15,124
2397	Dallam	Texas	$19,752	$40,895	$44,301	6,854	2,375
2398	Coal	Oklahoma	$19,752	$34,867	$44,888	5,927	2,328
2399	Barren	Kentucky	$19,745	$38,873	$51,272	42,504	16,584
2400	McMinn	Tennessee	$19,744	$39,410	$48,576	52,338	20,313
2401	Liberty	Texas	$19,740	$47,228	$54,581	76,013	24,844
2402	Grant	Washington	$19,738	$45,949	$52,848	90,202	30,012
2403	Powell	Montana	$19,736	$40,802	$49,342	7,052	2,411
2404	Forrest	Mississippi	$19,736	$36,726	$46,827	75,991	27,822
2405	Russell	Virginia	$19,735	$33,872	$43,459	28,646	11,191
2406	Vernon	Missouri	$19,734	$38,679	$48,014	20,990	7,999
2407	Yukon-Koyukuk Census Area	Alaska	$19,729	$34,710	$46,875	5,656	2,056
2408	Saluda	South Carolina	$19,725	$38,514	$44,705	19,895	7,020
2409	Alger	Michigan	$19,717	$37,586	$46,083	9,497	3,607
2410	Benton	Missouri	$19,717	$32,951	$42,896	19,008	8,225
2411	Perry	Illinois	$19,716	$42,078	$53,689	22,182	7,982
2412	Pike	Alabama	$19,715	$33,090	$46,574	32,977	12,959
2413	Emporia City	Virginia	$19,710	$32,155	$41,429	5,773	2,488
2414	Pettis	Missouri	$19,709	$38,580	$49,064	42,146	16,212
2415	Castro	Texas	$19,708	$36,402	$40,595	8,046	2,588
2416	Lincoln	Colorado	$19,703	$41,910	$51,875	5,442	1,845
2417	Burke	North Carolina	$19,701	$37,263	$49,127	90,591	34,664
2418	Audrain	Missouri	$19,687	$43,013	$53,564	25,584	9,327
2419	Russell	Alabama	$19,678	$36,143	$42,730	55,544	21,142
2420	Miller	Georgia	$19,674	$32,260	$41,058	6,054	2,458
2421	Caldwell	Texas	$19,673	$44,152	$51,289	38,465	11,593
2422	Crittenden	Arkansas	$19,665	$37,751	$48,372	50,447	18,309
2423	Montmorency	Michigan	$19,661	$35,261	$42,632	9,598	4,128
2424	Greene	Arkansas	$19,652	$38,413	$48,011	42,580	16,603
2425	Monroe	Tennessee	$19,643	$37,595	$44,907	44,857	17,523
2426	Appling	Georgia	$19,643	$36,786	$44,610	18,354	6,934
2427	Ogemaw	Michigan	$19,634	$34,619	$42,137	21,537	8,998
2428	Hardin	Ohio	$19,626	$40,415	$52,144	31,886	11,504
2429	Swain	North Carolina	$19,626	$36,094	$51,589	14,017	5,368
2430	Danville City	Virginia	$19,626	$30,786	$40,768	42,996	18,659
2431	Valencia	New Mexico	$19,623	$42,506	$51,686	76,461	26,894
2432	Tyler	Texas	$19,612	$39,940	$45,162	21,619	8,224
2433	LaRue	Kentucky	$19,611	$39,753	$50,559	14,149	5,221
2434	Jefferson	Idaho	$19,598	$52,023	$56,195	26,389	8,058
2435	Minidoka	Idaho	$19,597	$43,266	$49,733	20,104	6,994
2436	Randolph	West Virginia	$19,595	$37,276	$48,547	29,399	11,163
2437	Franklin City	Virginia	$19,588	$31,928	$43,780	8,539	3,551
2438	Marshall	Oklahoma	$19,583	$37,319	$47,769	15,860	5,970
2439	Cherokee	Kansas	$19,580	$39,746	$51,748	21,361	7,936
2440	Marion	Alabama	$19,576	$32,888	$41,733	30,615	12,700
2441	Lincoln	Mississippi	$19,566	$36,498	$41,572	34,870	13,045
2442	Doña Ana	New Mexico	$19,565	$37,933	$44,518	211,175	73,797
2443	Laclede	Missouri	$19,553	$39,013	$43,826	35,535	13,912
2444	Rutherford	North Carolina	$19,551	$36,334	$42,636	67,403	27,214
2445	Weakley	Tennessee	$19,547	$35,273	$50,628	34,779	13,797
2446	Warren	Tennessee	$19,531	$34,641	$43,922	39,861	15,366
2447	Grundy	Missouri	$19,527	$37,964	$47,000	10,282	4,148
2448	Jones	Mississippi	$19,519	$38,074	$43,888	68,174	24,677
2449	Mahnomen	Minnesota	$19,517	$40,282	$47,781	5,475	2,058
2450	Polk	Missouri	$19,511	$39,512	$49,245	31,088	11,937
2451	Alleghany	North Carolina	$19,510	$35,170	$40,767	11,046	4,793
2452	Franklin	Washington	$19,503	$55,177	$57,710	81,835	23,445
2453	Upshur	West Virginia	$19,498	$39,381	$49,740	24,371	9,011
2454	Polk	Texas	$19,498	$37,855	$45,690	45,620	16,980
2455	Whitfield	Georgia	$19,497	$40,471	$45,728	102,556	34,450
2456	Wayne	West Virginia	$19,497	$36,964	$46,749	42,007	16,555
2457	Chaves	New Mexico	$19,492	$39,131	$48,169	65,627	23,499
2458	Barry	Missouri	$19,489	$38,710	$47,663	35,614	13,464
2459	Alamosa	Colorado	$19,487	$34,520	$49,889	15,933	5,891
2460	Chariton	Missouri	$19,481	$39,385	$51,356	7,730	2,958
2461	Edmonson	Kentucky	$19,481	$37,646	$47,637	12,148	4,766
2462	Sampson	North Carolina	$19,479	$36,496	$43,557	63,687	23,336
2463	Crawford	Arkansas	$19,477	$39,479	$46,113	61,796	23,368
2464	Fremont	Idaho	$19,475	$44,520	$51,964	13,088	4,549
2465	Bollinger	Missouri	$19,470	$37,716	$45,273	12,408	4,758
2466	Harrison	Missouri	$19,468	$37,739	$44,691	8,871	3,515
2467	Union	Kentucky	$19,464	$39,125	$45,143	15,138	5,586
2468	St. Helena	Louisiana	$19,457	$33,143	$40,590	11,062	4,130
2469	Moniteau	Missouri	$19,451	$47,118	$59,253	15,657	5,464
2470	Van Buren	Tennessee	$19,450	$33,547	$41,019	5,562	2,097
2471	Johnson	Kentucky	$19,445	$34,090	$41,981	23,377	9,154
2472	Simpson	Kentucky	$19,441	$39,546	$47,303	17,443	6,737
2473	Columbia	Arkansas	$19,439	$35,128	$47,472	24,512	9,449
2474	Scioto	Ohio	$19,437	$35,379	$49,280	78,952	29,452
2475	Johnson	Nebraska	$19,435	$42,364	$53,932	5,182	1,926
2476	Yakima	Washington	$19,433	$43,506	$48,946	244,654	79,679
2477	Peach	Georgia	$19,431	$39,844	$52,500	27,481	9,525
2478	Carroll	Kentucky	$19,429	$40,160	$46,281	10,902	4,269
2479	Beaver	Utah	$19,415	$46,660	$56,184	6,529	2,112
2480	Union	Louisiana	$19,412	$35,828	$48,125	22,576	8,532
2481	Treutlen	Georgia	$19,410	$37,894	$46,282	6,817	2,515
2482	Talladega	Alabama	$19,410	$35,439	$43,074	81,845	31,486
2483	Brooks	Georgia	$19,409	$34,419	$46,973	15,885	6,573
2484	Jackson	Ohio	$19,405	$36,356	$44,755	33,034	13,288
2485	Meigs	Tennessee	$19,403	$35,150	$47,672	11,706	4,776
2486	Putnam	Missouri	$19,397	$36,713	$44,309	4,944	2,230
2487	Knox	Texas	$19,396	$34,295	$45,208	3,731	1,557
2488	St. Landry	Louisiana	$19,387	$35,503	$45,574	83,534	30,935
2489	Bradley	Arkansas	$19,386	$30,409	$39,659	11,418	4,789
2490	Miller	Missouri	$19,385	$35,507	$44,911	24,863	10,034
2491	Carroll	Virginia	$19,385	$32,853	$43,349	29,979	12,572
2492	Perry	Ohio	$19,372	$41,446	$48,828	36,051	13,793
2493	Johnson	Arkansas	$19,366	$31,003	$37,119	25,655	10,046
2494	Coryell	Texas	$19,357	$49,819	$56,459	75,966	20,416
2495	LaGrange	Indiana	$19,356	$47,617	$51,922	37,463	11,833
2496	Titus	Texas	$19,356	$42,939	$50,325	32,360	10,725
2497	Jefferson	Arkansas	$19,353	$37,140	$48,562	75,782	28,367
2498	Limestone	Texas	$19,352	$38,823	$49,121	23,417	7,929
2499	Pike	Kentucky	$19,351	$32,961	$42,210	64,473	26,362
2500	Highland	Ohio	$19,348	$39,091	$46,643	43,395	16,918
2501	Bourbon	Kansas	$19,340	$39,591	$50,231	15,004	5,636
2502	Nottoway	Virginia	$19,337	$36,607	$52,837	15,862	5,673
2503	Mecosta	Michigan	$19,336	$39,470	$50,330	43,007	15,536
2504	Hampton	South Carolina	$19,332	$34,233	$42,588	20,840	7,470
2505	Shelby	Missouri	$19,331	$35,938	$48,274	6,274	2,597
2506	Fulton	Arkansas	$19,326	$35,522	$41,720	12,266	5,140
2507	Lewis	Missouri	$19,317	$42,071	$49,043	10,193	3,936
2508	Columbia	Florida	$19,306	$38,070	$45,003	67,568	23,604
2509	Parmer	Texas	$19,304	$44,943	$47,096	10,159	3,215
2510	Fleming	Kentucky	$19,304	$32,495	$45,490	14,435	5,539
2511	Bedford	Tennessee	$19,303	$40,759	$47,774	45,339	16,402
2512	Clarke	Georgia	$19,295	$33,060	$50,744	118,864	41,358
2513	Hickman	Kentucky	$19,292	$34,029	$46,549	4,834	1,983
2514	Chambers	Alabama	$19,291	$32,402	$41,040	34,145	13,722
2515	Hot Spring	Arkansas	$19,286	$41,193	$49,541	33,182	12,231
20%	20th Percentile		$19,280				
2516	Sullivan	Missouri	$19,279	$36,676	$44,783	6,611	2,640
2517	Columbus	North Carolina	$19,275	$35,761	$45,865	57,761	21,758
2518	Union	Mississippi	$19,273	$38,373	$44,772	27,338	10,322
2519	Comanche	Texas	$19,268	$36,020	$45,503	13,829	5,162
2520	Adair	Missouri	$19,258	$34,733	$54,609	25,573	9,648
2521	Nowata	Oklahoma	$19,256	$39,430	$48,694	10,580	4,050
2522	Butler	Missouri	$19,246	$34,969	$43,135	42,946	17,085
2523	Yuba	California	$19,244	$44,902	$50,648	72,574	24,300
2524	Chowan	North Carolina	$19,240	$34,420	$43,512	14,782	5,945
2525	Jay	Indiana	$19,236	$40,235	$47,376	21,333	8,179
2526	Caldwell	North Carolina	$19,228	$34,357	$46,628	82,407	31,417
2527	Jim Hogg	Texas	$19,212	$36,121	$42,775	5,271	1,805
2528	Carter	Kentucky	$19,204	$36,406	$44,210	27,493	10,319
2529	Jackson	Louisiana	$19,188	$37,388	$45,490	16,217	6,090
2530	Sanders	Montana	$19,188	$32,881	$39,650	11,400	5,149
2531	Gordon	Georgia	$19,177	$40,926	$48,810	55,409	19,066
2532	Camp	Texas	$19,176	$37,079	$45,781	12,415	4,475
2533	Idaho County	Idaho	$19,168	$37,349	$44,962	16,269	6,534
2534	Payette	Idaho	$19,165	$43,649	$51,998	22,629	8,056
2535	Fannin	Georgia	$19,164	$34,239	$40,855	23,614	9,940
2536	Bladen	North Carolina	$19,154	$30,164	$43,210	34,969	14,256
2537	Laurens	South Carolina	$19,153	$37,383	$44,778	66,457	25,184
2538	Alcorn	Mississippi	$19,145	$33,600	$43,320	37,159	14,679
2539	Logan	Kentucky	$19,143	$36,590	$47,378	26,822	10,912
2540	Blaine	Nebraska	$19,141	$42,917	$45,625	586	249
2541	Lawrence	Tennessee	$19,136	$37,368	$47,649	41,927	15,862
2542	Franklin	Arkansas	$19,135	$36,766	$43,053	18,063	6,769
2543	Polk	Arkansas	$19,116	$32,835	$38,275	20,540	8,069
2544	Sevier	Utah	$19,115	$46,229	$53,997	20,798	7,146
2545	Grayson	Kentucky	$19,115	$32,399	$41,216	25,833	9,897
2546	Cleburne	Alabama	$19,108	$38,019	$46,069	14,945	5,601
2547	Wise	Virginia	$19,107	$36,218	$46,628	41,154	15,406
2548	Iron	Missouri	$19,101	$36,387	$44,069	10,505	4,126
2549	McIntosh	Oklahoma	$19,100	$36,096	$44,470	20,358	8,092
2550	Houston	Texas	$19,090	$33,119	$46,557	23,365	7,889
2551	Woodruff	Arkansas	$19,087	$28,259	$36,902	7,180	3,070
2552	Allen	Kentucky	$19,086	$40,008	$49,378	20,123	8,061
2553	Webster	Georgia	$19,082	$35,718	$51,458	2,769	1,129
2554	Otero	Colorado	$19,078	$33,848	$41,943	18,817	7,427
2555	Del Norte	California	$19,072	$37,909	$51,470	28,357	9,593
2556	Isabella	Michigan	$19,061	$36,372	$51,563	70,400	24,817
2557	Lawrence	Missouri	$19,060	$39,334	$47,950	38,488	14,817
2558	Warren	North Carolina	$19,052	$34,285	$44,587	20,792	7,731
2559	Logan	Arkansas	$19,046	$34,996	$46,489	22,221	8,233
2560	Jefferson	Oklahoma	$19,042	$34,701	$40,847	6,457	2,456
2561	Schley	Georgia	$19,037	$38,425	$52,391	5,017	1,829
2562	Union	South Carolina	$19,037	$32,556	$41,390	28,594	11,854
2563	Hardy	West Virginia	$19,032	$32,723	$43,097	13,922	5,020
2564	Charles Mix	South Dakota	$19,030	$40,102	$51,780	9,176	3,191
2565	Wilkes	North Carolina	$19,029	$33,159	$42,083	69,184	27,512
2566	Lamar	Alabama	$19,026	$36,028	$42,470	14,396	6,084
2567	Montgomery	Arkansas	$19,021	$31,345	$39,469	9,387	3,873
2568	Gallatin	Kentucky	$19,020	$43,793	$48,984	8,525	2,995
2569	Grant	Louisiana	$19,018	$39,654	$47,832	22,113	7,340
2570	Carter	Tennessee	$19,018	$31,842	$41,010	57,438	24,079
2571	Seward	Kansas	$19,015	$50,185	$52,529	23,146	7,429
2572	Red River	Texas	$19,014	$31,712	$42,371	12,709	5,052
2573	Osceola	Florida	$19,007	$43,891	$47,839	279,837	90,413
2574	Saline	Missouri	$19,006	$39,519	$46,731	23,324	8,764
2575	Ohio County	Kentucky	$19,005	$40,830	$44,200	23,955	8,715
2576	Hall	Texas	$19,004	$33,006	$45,593	3,310	1,177
2577	Nolan	Texas	$19,002	$36,806	$46,282	15,087	5,527
2578	Evans	Georgia	$18,998	$36,788	$46,369	10,902	4,067
2579	Winston	Alabama	$18,995	$32,900	$41,113	24,342	9,489
2580	Oceana	Michigan	$18,986	$40,023	$47,419	26,456	9,537
2581	Clarke	Alabama	$18,979	$29,357	$45,518	25,573	9,631
2582	Ouachita	Arkansas	$18,975	$32,015	$42,354	25,651	10,733
2583	Wayne	Missouri	$18,970	$33,159	$39,465	13,437	5,589
2584	Montcalm	Michigan	$18,969	$40,451	$47,435	63,234	23,400
2585	Coleman	Texas	$18,967	$31,373	$37,887	8,744	3,478
2586	Heard	Georgia	$18,964	$39,909	$49,381	11,708	4,321
2587	Crosby	Texas	$18,959	$38,187	$42,379	6,056	2,164
2588	Bienville	Louisiana	$18,958	$31,543	$42,271	14,229	5,668
2589	Wyandotte	Kansas	$18,957	$39,402	$47,025	158,348	57,291
2590	Fremont	Colorado	$18,954	$39,943	$48,623	46,850	16,938
2591	Rhea	Tennessee	$18,952	$36,741	$46,526	32,080	12,096
2592	Prowers	Colorado	$18,941	$34,391	$44,481	12,473	4,935
2593	Petersburg City	Virginia	$18,936	$34,424	$40,559	32,326	12,456
2594	Scott	Arkansas	$18,934	$37,448	$42,333	11,111	4,324
2595	Tift	Georgia	$18,933	$34,591	$41,712	40,537	13,691
2596	McDowell	North Carolina	$18,932	$35,297	$45,874	44,963	17,252
2597	Wayne	Mississippi	$18,928	$29,925	$38,502	20,675	8,105
2598	Oneida	Idaho	$18,920	$40,842	$46,802	4,257	1,579
2599	Kleberg	Texas	$18,918	$40,566	$48,275	32,052	11,241
2600	Habersham	Georgia	$18,910	$39,306	$48,610	43,181	14,805
2601	Mississippi County	Arkansas	$18,905	$36,428	$42,286	45,912	17,058
2602	Bamberg	South Carolina	$18,902	$31,483	$43,317	15,814	5,883
2603	Lowndes	Georgia	$18,897	$37,365	$49,499	111,334	39,722
2604	Haskell	Oklahoma	$18,896	$35,334	$46,474	12,849	4,713
2605	Franklin	Alabama	$18,888	$36,415	$46,536	31,666	12,437
2606	Bingham	Idaho	$18,872	$47,941	$54,323	45,485	14,650
2607	Randolph	Arkansas	$18,871	$34,418	$45,492	17,896	7,244
2608	Marion	Kentucky	$18,865	$38,719	$47,360	19,943	7,368
2609	Montgomery	North Carolina	$18,865	$31,830	$43,038	27,707	10,610
2610	Newton	Mississippi	$18,864	$39,190	$44,720	21,645	7,931
2611	Barnwell	South Carolina	$18,862	$35,231	$43,818	22,399	8,416
2612	Patrick	Virginia	$18,860	$34,864	$42,547	18,445	7,846
2613	Allen	Louisiana	$18,857	$38,429	$48,306	25,674	8,099
2614	Noble	Ohio	$18,853	$38,290	$43,146	14,639	4,883
2615	Decatur	Iowa	$18,845	$36,326	$46,275	8,308	3,106
2616	Ware	Georgia	$18,842	$34,572	$46,455	36,008	13,460
2617	Yuma	Arizona	$18,840	$41,595	$44,302	199,026	70,122
2618	Gratiot	Michigan	$18,836	$40,359	$50,893	42,148	14,787
2619	Elbert	Georgia	$18,835	$35,817	$41,387	19,907	7,635
2620	Motley	Texas	$18,828	$35,845	$40,000	1,182	433
2621	Meriwether	Georgia	$18,821	$37,333	$43,597	21,695	8,135
2622	Bristol City	Virginia	$18,820	$32,221	$41,025	17,713	7,674
2623	Chester	Tennessee	$18,817	$41,875	$52,983	17,151	5,936
2624	Meigs	Ohio	$18,816	$35,469	$44,783	23,659	9,560
2625	Hale	Alabama	$18,812	$30,051	$38,048	15,594	5,969
2626	Cherokee	Texas	$18,801	$38,378	$46,797	50,865	17,422
2627	Lamar	Georgia	$18,800	$41,016	$49,741	18,139	6,393
2628	Taylor	Kentucky	$18,790	$36,384	$46,250	24,585	9,708
2629	Martin	North Carolina	$18,783	$35,111	$44,633	24,147	9,444
2630	Van Buren	Arkansas	$18,782	$32,517	$42,607	17,147	7,063
2631	Washington County	North Carolina	$18,779	$34,936	$43,636	12,958	5,056
2632	Colleton	South Carolina	$18,769	$33,233	$41,716	38,453	14,905
2633	Luce	Michigan	$18,768	$39,469	$45,950	6,550	2,427
2634	Johnson	Illinois	$18,763	$40,760	$50,796	12,665	4,362
2635	Charlotte	Virginia	$18,762	$33,015	$43,384	12,478	4,751
2636	Sabine	Texas	$18,762	$32,963	$37,827	10,604	4,161
2637	Hoke	North Carolina	$18,761	$45,489	$53,584	48,842	16,161
2638	Fayette	Indiana	$18,757	$37,391	$46,311	24,112	9,536
2639	Madison	Arkansas	$18,754	$35,771	$43,373	15,671	6,048
2640	Yalobusha	Mississippi	$18,750	$32,930	$46,360	12,554	4,797
2641	Lamb	Texas	$18,744	$36,727	$45,304	13,921	4,803
2642	Trinity	Texas	$18,730	$34,555	$44,343	14,460	5,091
2643	Webster	Mississippi	$18,728	$33,524	$45,647	10,129	4,084
2644	Wilkinson	Mississippi	$18,717	$33,618	$39,966	9,653	3,496
2645	Toombs	Georgia	$18,716	$31,189	$46,442	27,229	10,310
2646	Haywood	Tennessee	$18,714	$34,542	$43,094	18,531	7,099
2647	Howard	Arkansas	$18,707	$35,879	$40,970	13,748	5,208
2648	Cross	Arkansas	$18,701	$38,085	$48,100	17,760	6,818
2649	Nevada County	Arkansas	$18,695	$33,694	$42,500	8,948	3,622
2650	San Augustine	Texas	$18,695	$28,390	$41,014	8,855	3,275
2651	Clay	Alabama	$18,694	$34,002	$43,598	13,703	5,649
2652	Neshoba	Mississippi	$18,693	$37,050	$41,449	29,655	10,829
2653	Fayette	West Virginia	$18,685	$33,771	$42,182	45,889	17,250
2654	Bailey	Texas	$18,676	$46,139	$48,681	7,121	2,358
2655	Torrance	New Mexico	$18,675	$31,161	$45,409	16,185	5,638
2656	Richland	Louisiana	$18,669	$36,835	$45,070	20,816	7,619
2657	Crockett	Tennessee	$18,664	$36,066	$43,693	14,576	5,619
2658	Lafayette	Florida	$18,660	$39,722	$52,627	8,745	2,710
2659	Pike	Missouri	$18,650	$39,850	$52,000	18,579	6,559
2660	Screven	Georgia	$18,640	$34,848	$46,591	14,455	5,165
2661	Braxton	West Virginia	$18,635	$31,848	$43,884	14,524	5,780
2662	Bullock	Alabama	$18,628	$32,033	$44,933	10,746	3,741
2663	Laurens	Georgia	$18,625	$34,793	$43,935	48,203	17,632
2664	Baldwin	Georgia	$18,622	$32,751	$48,719	46,018	16,338
2665	Dougherty	Georgia	$18,619	$31,671	$38,145	94,220	35,661
2666	Fulton	Kentucky	$18,602	$33,582	$39,274	6,650	2,744
2667	Benton	Mississippi	$18,597	$31,060	$42,436	8,682	3,195
2668	Cook	Georgia	$18,592	$34,985	$43,780	17,066	6,308
2669	Bulloch	Georgia	$18,587	$35,840	$52,100	71,190	25,254
2670	Claiborne	Tennessee	$18,583	$33,229	$42,766	31,915	12,553
2671	Cherokee	Oklahoma	$18,582	$37,260	$49,379	47,488	16,875
2672	Harmon	Oklahoma	$18,582	$26,688	$36,597	2,894	1,106
2673	Stone	Mississippi	$18,576	$42,963	$50,491	17,854	5,871
2674	Pontotoc	Mississippi	$18,576	$39,899	$50,403	30,207	9,937
2675	Orange	Indiana	$18,576	$38,826	$46,454	19,829	7,688
2676	Bacon	Georgia	$18,558	$33,757	$48,115	11,159	4,036
2677	Stephens	Georgia	$18,557	$37,898	$46,972	25,910	9,227
2678	Worth	Georgia	$18,551	$35,792	$44,411	21,670	7,851
2679	Gulf	Florida	$18,546	$40,455	$44,574	15,793	5,414
2680	St. Francois	Missouri	$18,544	$37,238	$46,537	65,602	24,654
2681	Dent	Missouri	$18,544	$36,311	$42,356	15,649	5,858
2682	Pushmataha	Oklahoma	$18,542	$29,897	$38,834	11,406	4,900
2683	Houston	Tennessee	$18,539	$35,271	$44,637	8,375	3,423
2684	Clay	Arkansas	$18,509	$31,502	$41,121	15,790	6,814
2685	Bland	Virginia	$18,501	$42,139	$48,906	6,795	2,480
2686	Winston	Mississippi	$18,501	$30,821	$40,589	19,052	7,635
2687	Bethel Census Area	Alaska	$18,497	$51,689	$53,224	17,356	4,358
2688	Anderson	Texas	$18,495	$40,653	$52,077	58,262	16,378
2689	Fayette	Alabama	$18,494	$33,838	$44,034	17,110	6,956
2690	Coosa	Alabama	$18,493	$37,277	$46,777	11,198	4,506
2691	Tippah	Mississippi	$18,493	$34,636	$41,358	22,080	8,472
2692	Union	New Mexico	$18,472	$38,902	$48,350	4,458	1,606
2693	Lincoln	West Virginia	$18,458	$35,487	$42,293	21,660	8,416
2694	Benton	Tennessee	$18,456	$33,033	$39,526	16,398	6,892
2695	Buena Vista City	Virginia	$18,453	$36,591	$49,429	6,699	2,738
2696	Reynolds	Missouri	$18,449	$34,496	$39,632	6,661	2,664
2697	Knott	Kentucky	$18,448	$33,889	$43,684	16,217	5,892
2698	Greene	North Carolina	$18,441	$40,853	$50,781	21,382	7,104
2699	Suwannee	Florida	$18,431	$35,698	$43,716	42,865	15,712
2700	Kings	California	$18,429	$48,133	$50,489	151,806	40,785
2701	McNairy	Tennessee	$18,428	$33,452	$41,545	26,066	9,736
2702	Attala	Mississippi	$18,422	$31,641	$41,356	19,383	7,185
2703	Crawford	Missouri	$18,415	$35,897	$44,985	24,711	9,485
2704	Hyde	North Carolina	$18,408	$42,279	$42,048	5,771	2,148
2705	Hidalgo	New Mexico	$18,392	$34,080	$37,432	4,834	1,837
2706	Jackson	Tennessee	$18,387	$33,386	$42,800	11,527	4,493
2707	Hickman	Tennessee	$18,383	$39,581	$47,683	24,428	8,846
2708	El Paso	Texas	$18,379	$40,157	$44,619	813,015	255,573
2709	Wyoming County	West Virginia	$18,377	$34,454	$47,602	23,479	9,101
2710	Putnam	Florida	$18,377	$32,497	$40,802	73,683	28,047
2711	Pike	Arkansas	$18,377	$32,206	$37,440	11,250	4,325
2712	Gooding	Idaho	$18,373	$37,050	$45,093	15,278	5,552
2713	Lowndes	Alabama	$18,368	$26,230	$40,783	11,086	4,212
2714	Overton	Tennessee	$18,347	$34,604	$43,587	22,109	8,815
2715	Cherokee	North Carolina	$18,340	$34,432	$43,178	27,243	10,722
2716	Tishomingo	Mississippi	$18,338	$32,592	$40,949	19,582	7,643
2717	Polk	Georgia	$18,336	$39,208	$48,675	41,308	14,645
2718	Ottawa	Oklahoma	$18,331	$36,473	$44,106	32,029	12,134
2719	Carroll	Tennessee	$18,330	$35,049	$45,351	28,525	11,022
2720	Seminole	Oklahoma	$18,321	$33,819	$42,751	25,443	9,327
2721	Copiah	Mississippi	$18,318	$35,421	$45,769	29,204	9,897
2722	Simpson	Mississippi	$18,314	$38,362	$44,651	27,439	9,786
2723	Levy	Florida	$18,304	$34,348	$41,278	40,289	15,582
2724	Clay	Mississippi	$18,273	$30,764	$39,169	20,539	7,750
2725	Hughes	Oklahoma	$18,268	$34,619	$44,973	13,838	4,920
2726	Menard	Texas	$18,253	$31,215	$41,250	2,213	871
2727	Carter	Missouri	$18,245	$30,962	$40,597	6,260	2,426
2728	Cherokee	South Carolina	$18,240	$34,202	$43,439	55,587	20,762
2729	Adams	Ohio	$18,235	$35,678	$43,771	28,406	10,816
2730	Franklin	Georgia	$18,234	$34,830	$45,934	21,998	8,618
2731	Perry	Kentucky	$18,224	$33,528	$40,814	28,488	10,801
2732	Dickenson	Virginia	$18,215	$33,318	$41,314	15,749	6,352
2733	Irwin	Georgia	$18,207	$40,771	$50,125	9,571	3,277
2734	White	Tennessee	$18,205	$34,474	$42,357	25,986	9,729
2735	Pershing	Nevada	$18,203	$52,101	$56,250	6,752	2,091
2736	Marion	Arkansas	$18,188	$34,494	$42,333	16,605	7,036
2737	Crisp	Georgia	$18,185	$35,240	$42,934	23,521	8,832
2738	Pike	Mississippi	$18,183	$34,841	$41,288	40,269	14,614
2739	Merced	California	$18,177	$42,591	$47,456	258,707	75,409
2740	Bronx	New York	$18,171	$34,388	$38,843	1,397,315	474,842
2741	Monroe	Mississippi	$18,167	$36,308	$45,361	36,652	13,960
2742	Benson	North Dakota	$18,162	$36,491	$40,821	6,721	2,291
—	San Juan	Puerto Rico	$18,160	$21,677	$27,916	395,326	145,321
2743	Schuyler	Missouri	$18,160	$34,688	$45,269	4,397	1,773
2744	Dallas	Missouri	$18,155	$40,120	$44,382	16,733	6,443
2745	DeKalb	Alabama	$18,149	$37,851	$45,213	71,076	24,923
2746	Clare	Michigan	$18,148	$32,668	$40,297	30,823	13,215
2747	Le Flore	Oklahoma	$18,141	$36,542	$44,408	50,062	18,412
2748	Prairie	Arkansas	$18,137	$34,855	$43,408	8,573	3,737
2749	Butler	Kentucky	$18,136	$35,430	$45,314	12,746	5,124
2750	Abbeville	South Carolina	$18,134	$35,947	$47,211	25,233	9,809
2751	Sequoyah	Oklahoma	$18,131	$35,742	$42,828	41,834	15,624
2752	Marion	Mississippi	$18,126	$29,400	$38,941	26,674	9,985
2753	Dodge	Georgia	$18,114	$37,292	$50,116	21,502	8,186
2754	Juab	Utah	$18,108	$55,247	$57,207	10,300	3,016
2755	Itawamba	Mississippi	$18,106	$36,073	$45,142	23,366	8,859
2756	Socorro	New Mexico	$18,104	$34,036	$44,076	17,756	5,329
2757	Breckinridge	Kentucky	$18,101	$38,907	$46,870	20,059	7,213
2758	Vinton	Ohio	$18,101	$36,705	$41,674	13,365	5,191
2759	Osceola	Michigan	$18,099	$37,788	$45,839	23,404	8,987
2760	Chester	South Carolina	$18,098	$33,103	$42,089	32,879	12,368
2761	Randolph	Georgia	$18,094	$30,023	$35,914	7,498	3,020
2762	Nodaway	Missouri	$18,079	$36,641	$56,449	23,347	8,599
2763	Jasper	Mississippi	$18,075	$31,170	$37,218	16,827	7,015
2764	Panola	Mississippi	$18,073	$35,715	$41,849	34,558	11,928
2765	Clarke	Mississippi	$18,066	$31,362	$41,518	16,614	6,305
2766	Decatur	Georgia	$18,059	$30,619	$42,523	27,676	10,525
2767	Oscoda	Michigan	$18,057	$33,239	$40,517	8,590	3,781
2768	Calhoun	West Virginia	$18,053	$31,679	$41,920	7,603	3,141
2769	Izard	Arkansas	$18,040	$30,661	$39,717	13,560	5,682
2770	Tillman	Oklahoma	$18,035	$36,354	$45,487	7,898	3,013
2771	Evangeline	Louisiana	$18,023	$31,832	$41,022	33,793	11,967
2772	San Saba	Texas	$18,009	$37,743	$45,678	6,050	2,035
2773	Avoyelles	Louisiana	$18,006	$33,942	$40,311	41,765	15,332
2774	Hale	Texas	$18,004	$41,191	$45,971	36,150	11,624
2775	Dunklin	Missouri	$17,990	$31,304	$38,503	31,916	12,882
2776	Glascock	Georgia	$17,984	$37,760	$49,279	3,094	1,189
2777	Green	Kentucky	$17,984	$34,406	$44,338	11,252	4,495
2778	West Carroll	Louisiana	$17,980	$33,848	$44,018	11,540	4,130
2779	Marshall	Mississippi	$17,978	$36,022	$41,319	36,823	13,050
2780	Upson	Georgia	$17,978	$35,329	$43,590	26,918	10,341
2781	Caswell	North Carolina	$17,975	$35,315	$45,925	23,462	8,813
2782	Candler	Georgia	$17,974	$35,070	$42,466	11,045	3,861
2783	Greer	Oklahoma	$17,969	$39,900	$48,694	6,178	2,246
2784	Lawrence	Kentucky	$17,960	$33,525	$42,182	15,877	5,823
2785	Clark	Arkansas	$17,960	$32,721	$48,735	22,912	8,341
2786	Twiggs	Georgia	$17,952	$31,234	$35,901	8,808	3,056
2787	Clayton	Georgia	$17,950	$40,606	$45,355	262,455	86,274
2788	Halifax	North Carolina	$17,937	$32,329	$42,607	54,251	21,550
2789	Webster	West Virginia	$17,937	$27,645	$34,786	9,073	3,928
2790	Quay	New Mexico	$17,936	$30,802	$41,304	8,890	3,476
2791	Morgan	Missouri	$17,935	$34,797	$45,048	20,392	8,164
2792	Grainger	Tennessee	$17,933	$32,364	$41,071	22,653	9,003
2793	Real	Texas	$17,931	$33,885	$38,438	3,348	1,127
2794	San Miguel	New Mexico	$17,926	$28,275	$40,284	29,093	11,435
2795	McDuffie	Georgia	$17,922	$37,487	$44,510	21,697	8,143
2796	Northampton	North Carolina	$17,919	$31,433	$37,249	21,645	8,604
2797	Vance	North Carolina	$17,905	$34,987	$41,930	45,120	16,640
2798	Tulare	California	$17,894	$42,708	$45,500	446,644	131,642
2799	Letcher	Kentucky	$17,886	$31,200	$44,104	24,202	9,366
2800	Newton	Arkansas	$17,884	$30,038	$37,243	8,211	3,507
2801	Warren	Georgia	$17,884	$27,796	$34,030	5,706	2,208
2802	Swisher	Texas	$17,880	$36,753	$45,110	7,807	2,604
2803	Sumter	Georgia	$17,879	$33,796	$43,138	32,099	11,493
2804	Barbour	West Virginia	$17,876	$37,327	$44,395	16,655	6,099
2805	Gilmer	West Virginia	$17,870	$38,442	$49,852	8,678	2,590
2806	Texas County	Missouri	$17,868	$36,082	$45,212	25,830	9,370
2807	Val Verde	Texas	$17,867	$40,450	$45,452	48,730	15,082
2808	Hertford	North Carolina	$17,863	$33,406	$41,713	24,516	8,624
2809	Caddo	Oklahoma	$17,858	$39,267	$48,238	29,605	10,230
2810	Madera	California	$17,847	$45,625	$50,772	151,435	42,516
2811	Todd	Kentucky	$17,846	$41,541	$51,241	12,505	4,574
2812	Ritchie	West Virginia	$17,843	$35,769	$45,615	10,303	4,032
2813	Atoka	Oklahoma	$17,842	$37,012	$41,653	14,070	5,303
2814	Iron	Utah	$17,839	$42,369	$49,829	46,435	15,435
2815	Clinch	Georgia	$17,815	$30,345	$42,792	6,766	2,586
2816	Sanpete	Utah	$17,811	$48,369	$58,486	27,930	7,781
2817	Cassia	Idaho	$17,801	$42,039	$51,608	23,054	7,653
2818	Okeechobee	Florida	$17,787	$34,570	$43,119	39,642	12,999
2819	Pulaski	Georgia	$17,781	$41,550	$48,257	11,775	4,034
2820	Calhoun	Arkansas	$17,763	$30,980	$44,638	5,319	2,046
2821	Canyon	Idaho	$17,755	$42,105	$47,302	192,153	63,442
2822	Franklin	Louisiana	$17,752	$31,214	$40,147	20,699	7,704
2823	Sierra	New Mexico	$17,752	$27,430	$40,786	11,898	4,350
2824	Lewis	Tennessee	$17,751	$34,397	$42,415	12,049	4,750
2825	Bradford	Florida	$17,749	$40,259	$49,562	27,981	8,857
2826	Morgan	Tennessee	$17,747	$37,631	$45,434	21,964	7,455
2827	Choctaw	Oklahoma	$17,739	$30,201	$42,011	15,167	6,043
2828	Washington Parish	Louisiana	$17,735	$31,778	$41,963	46,935	17,599
2829	Hampshire	West Virginia	$17,734	$27,766	$45,831	23,746	10,570
10%	10th Percentile		$17,730				
2830	Floyd	Kentucky	$17,716	$30,476	$37,838	39,448	15,422
2831	Wayne	Tennessee	$17,706	$33,198	$44,653	16,996	6,093
2832	Washington County	Missouri	$17,703	$34,702	$41,108	25,135	9,199
2833	Baraga	Michigan	$17,701	$41,189	$51,705	8,787	3,234
2834	Cumberland	Kentucky	$17,697	$31,593	$37,620	6,842	2,604
2835	Orangeburg	South Carolina	$17,687	$34,110	$42,038	91,836	34,180
2836	Power	Idaho	$17,684	$44,212	$45,837	7,756	2,568
2837	Jeff Davis	Georgia	$17,684	$36,296	$42,577	15,042	5,509
2838	Dawson	Texas	$17,677	$39,714	$51,946	13,771	4,414
2839	Clarendon	South Carolina	$17,665	$31,410	$40,172	34,652	12,690
2840	Santa Cruz	Arizona	$17,664	$37,745	$41,774	47,122	15,078
2841	Arthur	Nebraska	$17,656	$40,568	$48,750	507	177
2842	Robertson	Kentucky	$17,641	$31,786	$49,643	2,254	884
2843	Seminole	Georgia	$17,641	$30,521	$38,173	8,831	3,317
2844	Lunenburg	Virginia	$17,630	$35,237	$41,875	12,759	4,572
2845	Franklin	Idaho	$17,620	$44,962	$56,044	12,801	4,150
2846	Gadsden	Florida	$17,615	$35,380	$50,314	46,860	16,662
2847	McCurtain	Oklahoma	$17,615	$31,790	$40,224	33,143	13,078
2848	Turner	Georgia	$17,609	$28,326	$34,176	8,637	3,166
2849	Randolph	Missouri	$17,587	$37,203	$47,844	25,253	8,925
2850	Early	Georgia	$17,579	$28,853	$40,732	10,787	4,030
2851	Jenkins	Georgia	$17,565	$26,104	$35,490	8,642	3,354
2852	Adams	Mississippi	$17,544	$27,381	$36,044	32,308	12,087
2853	Deaf Smith	Texas	$17,532	$41,444	$47,763	19,307	6,191
2854	Jackson	Florida	$17,525	$36,809	$48,028	49,326	16,244
2855	Dimmit	Texas	$17,516	$36,681	$44,403	10,270	3,542
2856	Washington County	Georgia	$17,515	$33,652	$45,757	20,982	7,119
2857	Claiborne	Louisiana	$17,512	$32,996	$39,539	16,964	5,726
2858	McDonald	Missouri	$17,505	$37,997	$45,172	22,892	8,221
2859	Buchanan	Virginia	$17,489	$29,848	$38,734	23,920	9,485
2860	Uvalde	Texas	$17,479	$34,902	$41,173	26,578	8,619
2861	Marion	Georgia	$17,479	$33,301	$49,229	8,673	3,000
2862	Roosevelt	New Mexico	$17,477	$38,764	$42,703	19,984	7,043
2863	Cocke	Tennessee	$17,476	$30,573	$39,065	35,596	14,917
2864	Blaine	Montana	$17,437	$37,151	$41,797	6,550	2,237
2865	Bibb	Alabama	$17,427	$36,447	$43,004	22,754	7,091
2866	Union	Tennessee	$17,426	$34,399	$40,717	19,177	7,406
2867	Lincoln	Kentucky	$17,420	$33,651	$43,121	24,602	9,692
2868	Summers	West Virginia	$17,416	$33,784	$44,595	13,795	5,350
2869	Howell	Missouri	$17,416	$32,533	$41,181	40,458	15,796
2870	Butler	Alabama	$17,403	$29,918	$38,500	20,624	8,235
2871	Stone	Arkansas	$17,403	$29,832	$39,665	12,517	5,135
2872	Washington County	Florida	$17,385	$38,501	$45,152	24,702	8,533
2873	Hempstead	Arkansas	$17,376	$32,056	$43,407	22,509	8,296
2874	Cochran	Texas	$17,371	$38,650	$43,458	3,068	1,039
2875	Adair	Kentucky	$17,371	$32,524	$45,463	18,696	7,241
2876	Hickory	Missouri	$17,361	$29,325	$36,457	9,499	4,219
2877	Jasper	South Carolina	$17,350	$36,413	$42,070	25,408	8,563
2878	Roane	West Virginia	$17,341	$28,513	$38,920	14,807	5,975
2879	St. Clair	Missouri	$17,337	$31,539	$42,242	9,649	4,139
2880	Wheatland	Montana	$17,336	$31,867	$43,594	2,138	817
2881	Doddridge	West Virginia	$17,334	$34,817	$43,622	8,213	2,778
2882	Madison	Missouri	$17,316	$35,870	$39,718	12,350	4,603
2883	Conejos	Colorado	$17,316	$34,526	$44,338	8,256	3,099
2884	Hart	Kentucky	$17,273	$33,408	$42,359	18,345	7,115
2885	Wayne	Georgia	$17,270	$35,830	$43,465	30,187	10,171
2886	Lanier	Georgia	$17,264	$39,452	$51,739	10,250	3,725
2887	Dallas	Alabama	$17,245	$26,519	$38,063	43,091	16,173
2888	Covington	Mississippi	$17,241	$33,381	$42,657	19,520	7,036
2889	Richmond	North Carolina	$17,236	$32,384	$40,322	46,534	18,254
2890	Wilkinson	Georgia	$17,228	$36,173	$44,025	9,520	3,348
2891	Ozark	Missouri	$17,215	$32,078	$37,938	9,653	4,063
2892	Perry	Tennessee	$17,214	$32,845	$39,661	7,861	3,187
2893	Lafayette	Arkansas	$17,212	$29,732	$38,913	7,501	2,722
2894	Prince Edward	Virginia	$17,208	$37,436	$48,282	23,166	7,453
2895	Crowley	Colorado	$17,187	$31,477	$41,270	5,629	1,173
2896	Perry	Mississippi	$17,183	$36,124	$40,267	12,174	4,483
2897	Jerome	Idaho	$17,182	$40,126	$46,585	22,391	7,676
2898	Holmes	Ohio	$17,177	$45,477	$53,295	42,841	12,467
2899	Tensas	Louisiana	$17,175	$27,543	$35,328	5,105	2,049
2900	Metcalfe	Kentucky	$17,171	$31,750	$40,943	10,043	3,919
2901	Graham	Arizona	$17,168	$44,943	$50,583	37,168	11,031
2902	Buckingham	Virginia	$17,167	$38,648	$48,786	17,126	5,817
2903	Long	Georgia	$17,158	$42,651	$50,522	15,285	4,841
2904	Pickens	Alabama	$17,153	$28,741	$38,728	19,516	7,926
2905	Choctaw	Mississippi	$17,145	$29,876	$41,164	8,440	3,378
2906	Chesterfield	South Carolina	$17,140	$31,252	$40,989	46,452	17,622
2907	Duplin	North Carolina	$17,122	$34,433	$42,029	59,169	22,052
2908	Scott	Tennessee	$17,121	$28,401	$35,842	22,154	8,206
2909	Wilkes	Georgia	$17,120	$28,983	$39,534	10,265	4,083
2910	Russell	Kentucky	$17,107	$29,721	$37,256	17,636	7,270
2911	Thurston	Nebraska	$17,106	$41,400	$49,612	6,915	2,050
2912	Charlton	Georgia	$17,102	$40,111	$50,091	13,080	3,727
2913	Bertie	North Carolina	$17,096	$30,768	$40,850	20,879	7,629
2914	Rowan	Kentucky	$17,094	$35,236	$47,044	23,425	8,305
2915	Harrisonburg City	Virginia	$17,080	$38,048	$53,588	49,926	15,701
2916	Taylor	Georgia	$17,078	$27,455	$35,017	8,595	3,681
2917	Emanuel	Georgia	$17,064	$32,046	$37,388	22,669	8,026
2918	Drew	Arkansas	$17,057	$31,171	$39,884	18,686	7,496
2919	Taylor	Florida	$17,045	$36,356	$42,684	22,660	7,672
2920	Calhoun	Mississippi	$17,034	$30,000	$39,502	14,875	5,944
2921	Coffee	Georgia	$17,031	$35,693	$41,964	42,841	14,497
2922	Colquitt	Georgia	$17,025	$32,484	$38,765	45,781	15,918
2923	Athens	Ohio	$17,019	$33,823	$50,583	64,811	22,181
2924	Baker	Georgia	$17,019	$27,353	$46,696	3,410	1,374
2925	Macon	Tennessee	$17,009	$35,306	$42,307	22,416	8,544
2926	Talbot	Georgia	$16,993	$32,424	$38,993	6,689	2,682
2927	Yell	Arkansas	$16,992	$35,535	$41,469	22,014	7,917
2928	Amite	Mississippi	$16,977	$30,750	$36,277	13,061	5,212
2929	Edgecombe	North Carolina	$16,971	$33,960	$42,351	56,049	21,021
2930	Piute	Utah	$16,959	$38,500	$50,179	1,791	570
2931	Adams	Washington	$16,940	$43,926	$48,121	18,802	5,738
2932	Monroe	Arkansas	$16,939	$27,263	$35,422	8,002	3,393
2933	Brantley	Georgia	$16,938	$36,070	$41,975	18,409	6,550
2934	Poinsett	Arkansas	$16,919	$32,089	$39,616	24,403	9,369
2935	Carroll	Mississippi	$16,897	$31,039	$41,038	10,501	3,757
2936	Roosevelt	Montana	$16,888	$36,920	$49,649	10,665	3,264
2937	Pemiscot	Missouri	$16,881	$28,889	$38,152	18,160	6,941
2938	Clay	Tennessee	$16,867	$29,727	$36,659	7,816	3,281
2939	Shannon	Missouri	$16,862	$31,132	$41,440	8,388	3,220
2940	Dixie	Florida	$16,851	$33,981	$42,959	16,234	6,130
2941	Walthall	Mississippi	$16,850	$31,090	$43,597	15,265	5,649
2942	Bee	Texas	$16,848	$43,690	$50,229	32,281	8,539
2943	Holmes	Florida	$16,845	$35,511	$45,713	19,864	6,808
2944	Dallas	Arkansas	$16,838	$28,931	$39,681	8,045	3,269
2945	Terrell	Georgia	$16,836	$32,628	$38,007	9,246	3,351
2946	Phillips	Arkansas	$16,830	$26,737	$34,684	21,253	8,339
2947	Barbour	Alabama	$16,829	$32,911	$43,462	27,321	9,200
2948	Macon	Alabama	$16,826	$30,724	$41,233	20,803	8,107
2949	Campbell	Tennessee	$16,812	$31,943	$39,284	40,553	15,959
2950	Johnson	Georgia	$16,807	$36,722	$43,634	9,903	3,250
2951	Clinton	Kentucky	$16,795	$27,100	$31,364	10,210	3,960
2952	Scott	Mississippi	$16,789	$34,534	$39,404	28,255	9,692
2953	Winn	Louisiana	$16,789	$34,322	$45,200	15,129	5,402
2954	Berrien	Georgia	$16,784	$32,258	$42,594	19,174	7,040
2955	Leake	Mississippi	$16,780	$32,521	$38,766	23,519	8,069
2956	Imperial	California	$16,763	$41,807	$45,540	175,201	48,099
2957	Anson	North Carolina	$16,752	$33,870	$39,667	26,569	9,686
2958	Somerset	Maryland	$16,748	$38,447	$53,413	26,347	8,419
2959	Clay	West Virginia	$16,740	$31,613	$42,629	9,352	3,435
2960	Searcy	Arkansas	$16,731	$30,779	$39,444	8,101	3,296
2961	Sharp	Arkansas	$16,714	$30,861	$40,550	17,203	7,023
2962	Kinney	Texas	$16,700	$33,257	$45,375	3,589	1,195
2963	Morehouse	Louisiana	$16,683	$28,585	$39,570	27,603	10,482
2964	Chickasaw	Mississippi	$16,677	$31,061	$36,783	17,403	6,614
2965	Zapata	Texas	$16,671	$31,109	$37,267	14,164	4,460
2966	Washington County	Mississippi	$16,671	$28,093	$33,025	50,578	18,123
2967	Lee	Virginia	$16,664	$31,308	$40,704	25,497	9,653
2968	Tyrrell	North Carolina	$16,658	$34,216	$38,493	4,272	1,480
2969	Monroe	Kentucky	$16,656	$29,808	$39,949	10,874	4,401
2970	DeKalb	Missouri	$16,635	$44,092	$57,163	12,873	3,769
2971	Navajo	Arizona	$16,626	$36,927	$43,516	107,326	34,343
2972	Prentiss	Mississippi	$16,589	$32,503	$42,093	25,354	9,611
—	Gurabo	Puerto Rico	$16,559	$32,625	$35,589	45,369	15,223
Guam			$16,549	$48,274	$50,607	162,742	42,026
—	Guam	Guam	$16,549	$48,274	$50,607	162,742	42,026
2973	Sussex	Virginia	$16,546	$39,635	$53,520	12,007	3,704
2974	Escambia	Alabama	$16,540	$30,687	$36,550	38,169	13,681
2975	Chicot	Arkansas	$16,538	$26,201	$34,451	11,621	4,510
2976	Marion	South Carolina	$16,531	$29,149	$38,974	32,695	12,049
2977	Lincoln	Idaho	$16,530	$42,433	$47,756	5,221	1,617
2978	Okfuskee	Oklahoma	$16,528	$35,170	$43,452	12,268	4,246
2979	Rockcastle	Kentucky	$16,513	$30,674	$39,404	16,997	6,605
2980	Falls	Texas	$16,486	$32,908	$43,216	17,719	5,600
2981	Johnson	Tennessee	$16,470	$29,609	$36,866	18,158	6,921
2982	Bolivar	Mississippi	$16,462	$28,599	$36,443	34,107	12,301
2983	Montgomery	Georgia	$16,460	$32,702	$42,933	9,050	3,185
2984	Fentress	Tennessee	$16,454	$29,192	$37,837	17,943	7,348
2985	Murray	Georgia	$16,449	$34,888	$44,811	39,504	14,092
2986	Estill	Kentucky	$16,435	$29,184	$36,327	14,601	5,829
2987	Concordia	Louisiana	$16,431	$29,022	$38,125	20,652	7,642
2988	Leslie	Kentucky	$16,424	$29,293	$37,796	11,220	4,206
2989	Ripley	Missouri	$16,408	$32,291	$37,009	14,071	5,544
2990	Douglas	Missouri	$16,404	$32,130	$38,312	13,647	5,178
2991	Wayne	Kentucky	$16,396	$29,497	$36,059	20,797	8,083
2992	Greensville	Virginia	$16,380	$39,697	$47,517	12,078	3,389
2993	Bath	Kentucky	$16,367	$30,797	$36,823	11,732	4,447
2994	Cedar	Missouri	$16,362	$30,302	$38,058	13,903	5,970
2995	Malheur	Oregon	$16,352	$35,578	$45,825	30,898	10,136
2996	Oregon County	Missouri	$16,331	$27,743	$36,791	10,935	4,572
2997	Walker	Texas	$16,330	$37,617	$55,377	68,110	20,558
2998	Hamilton	Florida	$16,295	$37,716	$46,295	14,655	4,657
2999	Bennett	South Dakota	$16,275	$37,607	$40,282	3,431	1,059
3000	Liberty	Florida	$16,266	$39,681	$52,230	8,308	2,305
3001	Harlan	Kentucky	$16,257	$25,906	$33,791	29,012	11,343
3002	Morgan	Kentucky	$16,233	$30,658	$41,116	13,657	4,697
3003	Culberson	Texas	$16,227	$37,105	$43,793	2,345	838
3004	Jefferson Davis	Mississippi	$16,216	$27,186	$34,986	12,248	4,895
3005	Lake	Michigan	$16,202	$29,379	$37,664	11,485	4,096
—	Carolina	Puerto Rico	$16,188	$29,082	$32,352	176,762	64,056
3006	Radford City	Virginia	$16,181	$30,714	$57,450	16,705	5,516
3007	Garza	Texas	$16,175	$47,540	$56,979	6,356	1,588
3008	Presidio	Texas	$16,175	$29,634	$36,559	7,579	2,616
3009	Burke	Georgia	$16,171	$31,494	$41,707	23,223	7,881
3010	Hendry	Florida	$16,133	$35,425	$40,657	38,346	11,223
3011	Lewis	Kentucky	$16,132	$28,388	$40,119	13,859	5,003
3012	Cibola	New Mexico	$16,129	$37,237	$42,024	27,296	8,016
3013	Luna	New Mexico	$16,114	$29,282	$35,762	25,001	8,862
3014	Brunswick	Virginia	$16,060	$36,293	$45,838	17,220	5,826
3015	Chattooga	Georgia	$16,045	$33,228	$40,623	25,670	9,457
3016	Sevier	Arkansas	$16,021	$35,153	$44,267	17,137	5,745
3017	Glades	Florida	$16,011	$34,694	$37,317	13,080	3,843
3018	Lawrence	Arkansas	$15,971	$32,239	$42,457	17,227	6,580
3019	Whitley	Kentucky	$15,960	$29,769	$37,441	35,718	13,172
3020	Atkinson	Georgia	$15,958	$30,049	$34,500	8,332	2,758
3021	Owyhee	Idaho	$15,945	$32,175	$37,118	11,474	3,911
3022	Menifee	Kentucky	$15,942	$29,108	$33,897	6,334	2,379
3023	Mitchell	Texas	$15,936	$42,045	$53,022	9,388	2,748
3024	Jackson	Kentucky	$15,880	$26,156	$29,749	13,418	5,712
3025	Frio	Texas	$15,863	$35,849	$38,823	17,522	4,805
3026	Echols	Georgia	$15,861	$31,375	$41,818	4,053	1,382
3027	Mellette	South Dakota	$15,760	$35,109	$36,023	2,072	698
3028	Lauderdale	Tennessee	$15,758	$32,326	$38,356	27,794	9,686
3029	Monroe	Alabama	$15,749	$29,203	$36,807	22,778	8,333
3030	Bledsoe	Tennessee	$15,747	$33,443	$39,993	12,853	4,556
3031	Sharkey	Mississippi	$15,744	$35,125	$51,250	4,889	1,725
3032	Coahoma	Mississippi	$15,742	$26,407	$31,078	25,815	9,464
3033	Grady	Georgia	$15,734	$30,571	$38,759	25,143	9,290
—	Trujillo Alto	Puerto Rico	$15,703	$31,202	$36,024	74,842	24,357
3034	Big Horn	Montana	$15,695	$39,966	$46,968	12,939	3,444
3035	Mitchell	Georgia	$15,694	$32,054	$41,477	23,340	8,131
3036	Grundy	Tennessee	$15,683	$26,814	$35,507	13,657	5,359
3037	Scotland	North Carolina	$15,679	$29,592	$36,073	36,201	13,047
3038	Jackson	Arkansas	$15,609	$30,284	$38,639	17,809	6,541
3039	Conecuh	Alabama	$15,605	$24,658	$31,966	13,104	4,994
3040	Glacier	Montana	$15,604	$33,519	$36,701	13,528	4,194
3041	Casey	Kentucky	$15,603	$29,934	$41,516	16,006	6,050
3042	Dewey	South Dakota	$15,558	$30,710	$37,277	5,419	1,687
3043	Mississippi County	Missouri	$15,558	$29,787	$38,789	14,271	5,227
3044	Tunica	Mississippi	$15,549	$31,446	$34,946	10,660	4,116
3045	Madison	Florida	$15,538	$33,833	$40,486	19,070	6,739
3046	Martin	Kentucky	$15,525	$26,261	$31,922	12,835	4,449
3047	Montgomery	Mississippi	$15,523	$30,466	$37,395	10,754	4,229
3048	St. Francis	Arkansas	$15,511	$30,873	$34,705	27,914	9,358
3049	Rolette	North Dakota	$15,502	$31,336	$38,763	14,176	4,750
—	Dorado	Puerto Rico	$15,495	$29,354	$34,351	38,165	12,029
3050	Sioux	North Dakota	$15,478	$36,111	$34,042	4,258	1,116
3051	San Juan	Utah	$15,476	$40,492	$46,615	14,795	4,216
3052	Reeves	Texas	$15,467	$40,571	$44,980	13,775	3,542
3053	Hardee	Florida	$15,366	$37,125	$40,872	27,336	7,463
3054	Robeson	North Carolina	$15,343	$29,806	$35,861	134,535	45,154
3055	Tattnall	Georgia	$15,280	$37,587	$47,204	25,343	7,885
3056	Powell	Kentucky	$15,174	$26,839	$39,010	12,582	4,730
3057	Kenedy	Texas	$15,157	$43,438	$59,643	524	159
3058	Madison	Idaho	$15,133	$32,059	$37,385	37,542	10,323
3059	Madison	Texas	$15,131	$41,732	$49,303	13,689	3,743
3060	Magoffin	Kentucky	$15,118	$26,877	$34,600	13,179	4,931
3061	Adair	Oklahoma	$15,116	$32,556	$39,019	22,427	8,046
3062	Bell	Kentucky	$15,091	$26,228	$31,816	28,409	11,109
3063	DeSoto	Florida	$15,088	$34,963	$38,565	34,651	10,622
3064	Bent	Colorado	$15,081	$37,340	$42,598	6,141	1,873
3065	Lincoln	Arkansas	$15,023	$32,697	$40,936	14,148	4,188
3066	Dillon	South Carolina	$14,988	$28,817	$33,952	31,661	11,744
3067	Hardeman	Tennessee	$14,975	$30,973	$41,966	26,897	8,690
3068	Greene	Alabama	$14,930	$24,226	$31,809	8,934	3,264
3069	Calhoun	Georgia	$14,868	$26,986	$39,514	6,592	1,804
3070	Williamsburg	South Carolina	$14,845	$25,849	$39,346	33,944	11,621
3071	Jones	Texas	$14,827	$41,297	$51,219	20,079	5,641
3072	Lexington City	Virginia	$14,763	$36,505	$57,868	7,026	1,709
3073	Jefferson	Georgia	$14,757	$26,968	$34,739	16,696	6,220
3074	Wright	Missouri	$14,752	$28,645	$37,295	18,643	7,295
3075	Lee	South Carolina	$14,740	$27,373	$36,935	18,890	6,737
3076	Menominee	Wisconsin	$14,710	$33,333	$37,321	4,292	1,220
3077	Cameron	Texas	$14,710	$33,179	$36,332	410,710	117,836
3078	Breathitt	Kentucky	$14,706	$24,045	$28,825	13,776	5,290
3079	Calhoun	Florida	$14,675	$32,780	$39,384	14,700	4,696
3080	Marlboro	South Carolina	$14,577	$28,297	$31,440	28,542	9,779
3081	Webb	Texas	$14,553	$39,449	$41,410	254,829	67,372
3082	Dooly	Georgia	$14,510	$29,012	$38,617	14,554	5,133
3083	Greene	Mississippi	$14,463	$36,888	$47,109	14,337	4,117
3084	Taliaferro	Georgia	$14,381	$25,465	$36,500	1,766	704
3085	Knox	Kentucky	$14,367	$24,038	$32,879	31,865	12,350
3086	Brooks	Texas	$14,345	$21,865	$28,558	7,225	2,439
3087	Hancock	Tennessee	$14,326	$23,892	$30,776	6,737	2,835
3088	Leflore	Mississippi	$14,307	$24,480	$30,285	31,993	10,887
3089	Yazoo	Mississippi	$14,291	$26,336	$33,157	28,122	8,710
3090	Corson	South Dakota	$14,262	$30,880	$37,250	4,078	1,185
3091	Hidalgo	Texas	$14,222	$34,146	$36,884	790,646	217,691
3092	Ben Hill	Georgia	$14,204	$28,547	$35,307	17,576	6,110
3093	Quitman	Georgia	$14,201	$31,068	$33,333	2,396	932
3094	Guadalupe	New Mexico	$14,198	$29,071	$36,435	4,626	1,260
—	Toa Alta	Puerto Rico	$14,162	$29,672	$33,031	74,066	22,205
3095	Wolfe	Kentucky	$14,157	$22,574	$30,407	7,299	2,779
3096	Sumter	Alabama	$14,156	$22,186	$35,594	13,552	5,060
3097	Lawrence	Illinois	$14,147	$40,145	$48,269	16,702	4,872
3098	Hudspeth	Texas	$14,142	$22,545	$25,304	3,394	1,096
—	Bayamon	Puerto Rico	$14,138	$25,528	$30,025	208,116	69,318
3099	McDowell	West Virginia	$14,093	$22,252	$30,671	21,651	8,229
3100	Elliott	Kentucky	$14,040	$24,246	$33,786	7,784	2,618
3101	Lee	Kentucky	$13,969	$22,920	$30,036	7,554	2,951
3102	Quitman	Mississippi	$13,954	$22,863	$28,171	8,028	3,114
—	Caguas	Puerto Rico	$13,904	$24,229	$28,934	142,893	49,386
3103	Macon	Georgia	$13,865	$30,240	$37,668	14,455	4,887
3104	Kemper	Mississippi	$13,795	$29,003	$40,962	10,383	3,605
3105	Issaquena	Mississippi	$13,731	$24,767	$26,488	1,383	461
3106	Perry	Alabama	$13,716	$28,209	$32,108	10,390	3,400
3107	Maverick	Texas	$13,668	$31,395	$34,762	54,880	15,714
3108	Forest	Pennsylvania	$13,646	$36,556	$45,120	7,696	2,001
3109	Alexander	Illinois	$13,619	$26,972	$33,977	7,980	2,860
3110	Owsley	Kentucky	$13,611	$19,986	$29,973	4,738	1,721
3111	Union	Florida	$13,590	$42,660	$48,365	15,307	3,807
3112	Madison	Louisiana	$13,585	$25,498	$33,063	12,049	4,068
3113	Clay	Kentucky	$13,542	$21,883	$30,085	21,633	7,317
3114	Wilcox	Alabama	$13,379	$23,642	$26,739	11,531	3,866
3115	Allendale	South Carolina	$13,334	$25,252	$30,276	10,214	3,424
3116	La Salle	Texas	$13,307	$26,756	$36,632	6,921	1,864
3117	Stewart	Georgia	$13,238	$23,451	$32,566	6,007	1,851
3118	Wilcox	Georgia	$13,228	$32,928	$38,627	9,110	2,705
3119	Clay	Georgia	$12,982	$21,192	$28,352	3,133	1,235
3120	Humphreys	Mississippi	$12,874	$23,600	$28,816	9,258	3,107
3121	Zavala	Texas	$12,828	$25,625	$32,930	11,849	3,654
3122	Noxubee	Mississippi	$12,780	$24,338	$34,375	11,358	4,194
3123	Tallahatchie	Mississippi	$12,747	$29,853	$37,539	15,231	4,640
3124	Jefferson	Mississippi	$12,723	$26,028	$32,793	7,690	2,520
3125	Apache	Arizona	$12,709	$31,476	$37,095	71,978	19,055
3126	McKinley	New Mexico	$12,679	$30,458	$36,109	72,373	17,427
—	Cayey	Puerto Rico	$12,594	$20,442	$23,326	48,119	16,459
3127	Sunflower	Mississippi	$12,588	$26,619	$31,893	28,722	8,394
3128	Lee	Arkansas	$12,529	$25,034	$32,986	10,267	3,491
3129	Telfair	Georgia	$12,489	$26,634	$33,608	16,391	5,567
3130	Hancock	Georgia	$12,381	$25,000	$35,795	9,233	2,742
3131	Ziebach	South Dakota	$12,339	$32,708	$32,273	2,821	803
—	Toa Baja	Puerto Rico	$12,240	$24,583	$28,710	89,609	27,802
3132	Claiborne	Mississippi	$12,177	$23,689	$31,385	9,553	3,190
3133	Holmes	Mississippi	$12,113	$22,325	$25,995	18,931	6,511
Puerto Rico			$12,081	$19,775	$23,793	3,195,153	1,222,606
3134	East Carroll	Louisiana	$12,055	$25,321	$30,840	7,674	2,488
3135	Lake	Tennessee	$12,042	$27,115	$36,926	7,773	2,201
—	Ceiba	Puerto Rico	$11,840	$18,998	$22,247	13,631	4,532
3136	McCreary	Kentucky	$11,818	$20,972	$30,543	18,163	6,312
—	Humacao	Puerto Rico	$11,682	$18,735	$22,383	58,466	18,378
—	Cataño	Puerto Rico	$11,627	$18,663	$22,853	28,140	9,068
—	Hormigueros	Puerto Rico	$11,588	$19,674	$25,206	17,250	6,271
3137	Starr	Texas	$11,584	$24,927	$27,552	61,351	15,949
—	Culebra	Puerto Rico	$11,450	$23,355	$26,797	1,818	520
3138	Buffalo	South Dakota	$11,405	$30,962	$31,301	1,966	542
3139	Willacy	Texas	$11,313	$25,886	$31,592	22,039	5,499
3140	Kusilvak Census Area	Alaska	$11,210	$40,176	$40,750	7,678	1,744
—	Vieques	Puerto Rico	$11,136	$16,261	$24,500	9,301	2,555
—	Canovanas	Puerto Rico	$11,094	$19,986	$24,911	47,648	14,603
—	Cidra	Puerto Rico	$10,965	$20,389	$22,712	43,480	12,998
—	Fajardo	Puerto Rico	$10,900	$18,941	$22,940	36,993	12,436
—	Aguadilla	Puerto Rico	$10,872	$16,821	$19,491	60,949	21,322
—	Rio Grande	Puerto Rico	$10,804	$22,584	$26,704	54,304	15,938
—	Ponce	Puerto Rico	$10,775	$16,561	$19,993	166,327	53,341
—	Mayaguez	Puerto Rico	$10,656	$14,642	$20,087	89,080	29,769
—	Aguas Buenas	Puerto Rico	$10,615	$16,733	$20,507	28,659	8,594
3141	Todd	South Dakota	$10,575	$31,934	$32,671	9,783	2,680
—	Manati	Puerto Rico	$10,559	$18,191	$23,699	44,113	15,703
—	San Lorenzo	Puerto Rico	$10,497	$18,589	$22,756	41,058	13,670
—	Vega Alta	Puerto Rico	$10,492	$18,053	$21,235	39,951	12,529
—	Tinian	Northern Mariana Islands	$10,489	$24,470	$27,563	3,136	874
—	Santa Isabel	Puerto Rico	$10,478	$16,816	$19,995	23,274	7,759
—	Villalba	Puerto Rico	$10,449	$19,893	$23,363	26,073	7,761
—	Luquillo	Puerto Rico	$10,434	$19,377	$23,123	20,068	6,636
—	Hatillo	Puerto Rico	$10,360	$17,770	$22,702	41,953	14,443
—	Las Piedras	Puerto Rico	$10,342	$20,587	$24,225	38,675	12,534
—	Coamo	Puerto Rico	$10,307	$19,110	$22,392	40,512	13,783
—	Juana Diaz	Puerto Rico	$10,244	$20,228	$22,444	79,897	15,964
—	Aibonito	Puerto Rico	$10,224	$18,387	$21,491	25,900	8,573
—	Rincon	Puerto Rico	$10,220	$18,292	$21,526	15,200	5,079
—	Vega Baja	Puerto Rico	$10,197	$18,900	$23,604	59,662	17,746
—	Naguabo	Puerto Rico	$10,016	$18,976	$20,897	26,720	8,346
—	Rota	Northern Mariana Islands	$9,964	$23,125	$26,522	2,477	755
—	Arecibo	Puerto Rico	$9,954	$17,289	$21,288	96,440	32,308
—	Camuy	Puerto Rico	$9,738	$17,579	$21,360	35,159	11,571
Northern Mariana Islands			$9,656	$19,958	$22,455	53,833	16,035
—	Swains Island	American Samoa	$9,586	$27,500	$32,500	17	6
—	Saipan	Northern Mariana Islands	$9,586	$19,607	$22,086	48,220	14,406
—	San German	Puerto Rico	$9,563	$15,036	$19,904	35,527	11,922
—	Cabo Rojo	Puerto Rico	$9,523	$16,461	$20,607	50,917	16,495
—	Añasco	Puerto Rico	$9,344	$18,765	$22,396	29,261	9,255
—	Quebradillas	Puerto Rico	$9,287	$16,082	$19,163	25,919	8,491
—	Guayama	Puerto Rico	$9,183	$15,296	$18,195	45,362	14,989
—	Sabana Grande	Puerto Rico	$9,158	$15,736	$20,011	25,265	7,568
—	Juncos	Puerto Rico	$9,017	$18,553	$20,219	40,290	12,627
—	Aguada	Puerto Rico	$9,001	$16,199	$19,158	41,959	12,824
—	Naranjito	Puerto Rico	$8,996	$18,069	$22,340	30,402	8,696
3142	Wheeler	Georgia	$8,948	$24,382	$31,556	7,746	2,096
—	Maunabo	Puerto Rico	$8,830	$17,636	$22,117	12,225	3,976
—	Morovis	Puerto Rico	$8,816	$18,739	$20,723	32,610	10,129
—	Isabela	Puerto Rico	$8,798	$16,333	$18,768	45,631	15,230
3143	Oglala Lakota	South Dakota	$8,768	$25,648	$26,029	13,829	2,867
—	Barceloneta	Puerto Rico	$8,762	$17,113	$20,613	24,816	8,090
—	Salinas	Puerto Rico	$8,738	$16,246	$18,614	31,078	10,718
—	Loiza	Puerto Rico	$8,729	$17,273	$19,666	30,060	8,919
—	Patillas	Puerto Rico	$8,679	$14,512	$18,731	19,277	6,501
—	Yabucoa	Puerto Rico	$8,672	$15,586	$18,768	37,941	11,989
—	Guayanilla	Puerto Rico	$8,347	$14,988	$17,328	21,581	6,575
—	Lares	Puerto Rico	$8,212	$12,820	$16,259	30,753	10,051
—	Utuado	Puerto Rico	$8,140	$15,931	$19,856	33,149	9,727
—	Yauco	Puerto Rico	$8,124	$14,451	$19,773	42,043	10,749
—	San Sebastian	Puerto Rico	$8,072	$14,275	$17,487	42,430	14,278
—	Ciales	Puerto Rico	$8,049	$14,432	$16,812	18,782	5,949
—	Peñuelas	Puerto Rico	$7,983	$16,868	$18,399	24,282	7,132
—	Corozal	Puerto Rico	$7,887	$14,752	$18,152	37,142	11,026
—	Moca	Puerto Rico	$7,881	$13,413	$16,839	40,109	12,975
—	Florida	Puerto Rico	$7,837	$16,919	$20,656	12,680	4,300
—	Barranquitas	Puerto Rico	$7,716	$15,694	$16,939	30,318	9,109
—	Arroyo	Puerto Rico	$7,639	$15,689	$18,014	19,575	6,127
—	Orocovis	Puerto Rico	$7,326	$14,296	$16,354	23,423	6,797
—	Lajas	Puerto Rico	$7,229	$13,896	$15,939	25,753	8,059
—	Guanica	Puerto Rico	$7,207	$12,653	$14,029	19,427	5,528
—	Jayuya	Puerto Rico	$7,179	$15,615	$19,955	16,642	4,818
—	Las Marias	Puerto Rico	$7,154	$14,404	$19,698	9,881	3,033
—	Adjuntas	Puerto Rico	$7,117	$11,680	$13,582	19,483	6,166
—	Comerío	Puerto Rico	$7,047	$13,523	$15,799	20,778	6,075
—	Western District	American Samoa	$6,429	$24,705	$24,916	31,329	5,418
American Samoa			$6,311	$23,892	$24,706	55,519	9,688
—	Eastern District	American Samoa	$6,191	$23,350	$24,911	23,030	3,982
—	Maricao	Puerto Rico	$5,943	$13,462	$15,864	6,276	1,914
—	Manu’a District	American Samoa	$5,441	$17,614	$19,226	1,143	282
