= National Register of Historic Places listings in Henry County, Kentucky =

Location of Henry County in Kentucky

This is a list of the National Register of Historic Places listings in Henry County, Kentucky.

It is intended to be a complete list of the properties and districts on the National Register of Historic Places in Henry County, Kentucky, United States. The locations of National Register properties and districts for which the latitude and longitude coordinates are included below, may be seen in an online map.

There are 12 properties and districts listed on the National Register in the county.

This National Park Service list is complete through NPS recent listings posted December 12, 2025.

== Current listings ==
	Name on the Register	Image	Date listed	Location	City or town	Description
1	Callaway-Goodridge-Robertson Farm		February 3, 2010 (#09001308)	6041 Kentucky Route 1861; 38°23′00″N 85°16′03″W	Smithfield	
2	Confederate Soldiers Martyrs Monument in Eminence	Confederate Soldiers Martyrs Monument in Eminence	July 17, 1997 (#97000692)	Eminence Cemetery, 2 miles south of the junction of Kentucky Routes 22 and 55; 38°21′34″N 85°10′51″W	Eminence	
3	Crutcher House	Crutcher House	December 8, 1980 (#80001550)	Mulberry Pike; 38°21′36″N 85°10′15″W	Eminence	
4	Eminence Historic Commercial District	Eminence Historic Commercial District	February 9, 1979 (#79000994)	Broadway, Main and Penn Sts. 38°22′11″N 85°10′48″W	Eminence	
5	Isham Henderson House		January 8, 1987 (#87000156)	Main Cross Rd. 38°26′11″N 85°09′36″W	New Castle	
6	Henry County Courthouse, Jail, and Warden's House	Henry County Courthouse, Jail, and Warden's House	April 11, 1977 (#77000621)	Courthouse Sq. 38°26′02″N 85°10′09″W	New Castle	
7	Samuel Hieatt House		October 29, 1982 (#82001569)	North of Smithfield on Hieatt Rd. 38°25′03″N 85°15′28″W	Smithfield	
8	Highlands		July 9, 1979 (#79000995)	Southwest of Smithfield on Kentucky Route 22; 38°21′59″N 85°16′47″W	Smithfield	
9	New Castle Historic Commercial District		August 4, 2016 (#16000495)	Main & Main Cross Sts. 38°26′00″N 85°10′12″W	New Castle	
10	Robert Ricketts House		July 12, 1978 (#78001342)	North of New Castle off U.S. Route 421; 38°28′44″N 85°11′11″W	New Castle	
11	Thomas Smith House		February 8, 1978 (#78001343)	524 Cross Main St. 38°25′59″N 85°10′02″W	New Castle	Cross Main St. was renumbered. New address is 51 W. Cross Main St.
12	Thompson House		May 5, 1987 (#87000567)	Kentucky Route 22 and Old Giltner Rd. 38°21′58″N 85°11′54″W	Eminence	

== See also ==
- List of National Historic Landmarks in Kentucky
- National Register of Historic Places listings in Kentucky
- List of attractions and events in the Louisville metropolitan area
