= Henderson House =

Henderson House, and variations, may refer to:

== In Australia ==
- Henderson House, Footscray, listed on the Victorian Heritage Register

== In the United States ==
Arkansas

- Capt. Charles C. Henderson House, Arkadelphia, Arkansas, listed on the National Register of Historic Places (NRHP) in Clark County, Arkansas
- Henderson House (Little Rock, Arkansas), listed on the NRHP in Pulaski County, Arkansas

Colorado

- Henderson House (Denver, Colorado), a Denver Landmark

Florida

- T. G. Henderson House, Lake City, listed on the NRHP in Columbia County, Florida

Georgia

- Fletcher Henderson House, Cuthbert, Georgia, listed on the NRHP in Randolph County, Georgia
- Henderson-Orr House, Stallings Crossing, Georgia, listed on the NRHP in Coweta County, Georgia

Hawaii

- Walter Irving and Jean Henderson House, Hilo, Hawaii, listed on the NRHP in Hawaii County, Hawaii

Illinois

- Henderson House (University of Chicago), a college house of the University of Chicago, Chicago, Illinois
- Frank B. Henderson House, Elmhurst, Illinois, listed on the NRHP in DuPage County, Illinois

Iowa

- Daniel and Nancy Swaford Henderson House, Earlham, Iowa, listed on the NRHP in Madison County, Iowa

Kansas

- Sarah L. Henderson House, Stafford, Kansas, listed on the NRHP in Stafford County, Kansas

Kentucky

- Tom Henderson House, Lewisport, Kentucky, listed on the NRHP in Hancock County, Kentucky
- Isham Henderson House, New Castle, Kentucky, listed on the NRHP in Henry County, Kentucky

Massachusetts

- Dwight-Henderson House, Great Barrington, Massachusetts, listed on the NRHP in Berkshire County, Massachusetts
- Edward Peirce House-Henderson House of Northeastern University, Weston, Massachusetts, listed on the NRHP in Middlesex County, Massachusetts

Mississippi

- Henderson-Britton House, Natchez, Mississippi, listed on the NRHP in Adams County, Mississippi
- Hall-Henderson House, Sardis, Mississippi, listed on the NRHP in Panola County, Mississippi

Missouri

- Dr. Generous Henderson House, Kansas City, Missouri, listed on the NRHP in Jackson County, Missouri

North Carolina

- Isabelle Bowen Henderson House and Gardens, Raleigh, North Carolina, listed on the NRHP in Wake County, North Carolina

Ohio

- Joseph Henderson House, Columbus, Ohio, listed on the Columbus Register of Historic Properties
- Dr. David W. Henderson House, Marysville, Ohio, listed on the NRHP in Union County, Ohio
- John Henderson House, West Andover, Ohio, listed on the NRHP in Ashtabula County, Ohio

Pennsylvania

- Dr. William Henderson House, Hummelstown, Pennsylvania, listed on the NRHP in Dauphin County, Pennsylvania
- Henderson-Metz House, Pittsburgh, Pennsylvania, listed on the NRHP in Allegheny, Pennsylvania

South Carolina

- Irby-Henderson-Todd House, Laurens, South Carolina, listed on the NRHP in Laurens County, South Carolina
- Otway Henderson House, McCormick, South Carolina, listed on the NRHP in McCormick County, South Carolina

Tennessee

- William Henderson House, Louisville, Tennessee, listed on the NRHP in Blount County, Tennessee
- Logan Henderson Farm, Murfreesboro, Tennessee, listed on the NRHP in Rutherford County, Tennessee

Texas

- Wright-Henderson-Duncan House, Granbury, Texas, listed on the NRHP in Hood County, Texas
- S. W. Henderson-Bridges House, Lufkin, Texas, listed on the NRHP in Angelina County, Texas
- S. L. Henderson House, San Angelo, Texas, listed on the NRHP in Tom Green County, Texas

Utah

- William Jasper, Jr., and Elizabeth Henderson House, Cannonville, Utah, listed on the NRHP in Garfield County, Utah

Virginia

- Henderson House (Dumfries, Virginia)

Washington

- Henderson House (Tumwater, Washington)

== See also ==
- Henderson Hall (disambiguation)
