= Kentucky's 47th House of Representatives district =

American legislative district

Kentucky's 47th State House of Representatives district
Representative
Felicia Rabourn; R–Turners Station
since January 1, 2021
- Registration: 49.1% Republican; 42.3% Democratic; 8.0% No party preference
- Demographics: 90.1% White; 1.7% Black; 4.3% Hispanic; 0.2% Asian; 0.1% Native American; 0.4% Other; 3.1% Multiracial
- Population (2024): 46,690
- Registered voters (2026): 35,154

Kentucky's 47th House of Representatives district is one of 100 districts in the Kentucky House of Representatives. It comprises Carroll, Henry, Owen, and Trimble Counties. It has been represented by Felicia Rabourn (R–Turners Station) since 2021. As of 2024, the district had a population of 46,690.

== Voter registration ==
On January 1, 2026, the district had 35,154 registered voters, who were registered with the following parties.

Party	Registration	
Party	Voters	%
Republican	17,268	49.12
Democratic	14,882	42.33
Independent	1,246	3.54
Libertarian	145	0.41
Green	18	0.05
Constitution	15	0.04
Socialist Workers	4	0.01
Reform	1	0.00
"Other"	1,575	4.48
Total	35,154	100.00

== List of members representing the district ==
Member	Party	Years	Electoral history	District location
Jon Ackerson (Louisville)	Republican	January 1, 1987 – January 1, 1997	Elected in 1986. Reelected in 1988. Reelected in 1990. Reelected in 1992. Reelected in 1994. Retired to run for the Jeffersontown City Council.	1985–1993; Jefferson County (part).
Jon Ackerson (Louisville)	Republican	January 1, 1987 – January 1, 1997	Elected in 1986. Reelected in 1988. Reelected in 1990. Reelected in 1992. Reelected in 1994. Retired to run for the Jeffersontown City Council.	1993–1997; Jefferson County (part).
Ronald Crimm (Louisville)	Republican	January 1, 1997 – January 1, 2003	Elected in 1996. Reelected in 1998. Reelected in 2000. Redistricted to the 33rd district.	1997–2003
Rick Rand (Bedford)	Democratic	January 1, 2003 – January 1, 2021	Elected in 2002. Reelected in 2004. Reelected in 2006. Reelected in 2008. Reelected in 2010. Reelected in 2012. Reelected in 2014. Reelected in 2016. Reelected in 2018. Retired.	2003–2015
Rick Rand (Bedford)	Democratic	January 1, 2003 – January 1, 2021	Elected in 2002. Reelected in 2004. Reelected in 2006. Reelected in 2008. Reelected in 2010. Reelected in 2012. Reelected in 2014. Reelected in 2016. Reelected in 2018. Retired.	2015–2023
Felicia Rabourn (Turners Station)	Republican	January 1, 2021 – present	Elected in 2020. Reelected in 2022. Reelected in 2024. Reelected in 2026.	2015–2023
Felicia Rabourn (Turners Station)	Republican	January 1, 2021 – present	Elected in 2020. Reelected in 2022. Reelected in 2024. Reelected in 2026.	2023–present
