= Kentucky Route 153 =

State highway in Kentucky, United States

Kentucky Route 153

Route information
- Maintained by KYTC
- Length: 8.509 mi (13.694 km)

Major junctions
- South end: KY 1861 near Smithfield
- I-71 near Pendleton
- East end: US 42 near Pendleton

Location
- Country: United States
- State: Kentucky
- Counties: Henry

Highway system
- Kentucky State Highway System; Interstate; US; State; Parkways
← KY 152	→ KY 154

Kentucky Route 153 (KY 153) is a 8.509-mile-long (13.694 km) state highway in Henry County, Kentucky. It runs from KY 1861 west of Smithfield to U.S. Route 42 (US 42) north of Pendleton.

== Major intersections ==
The entire route is in Henry County.

Location	mi	km	Destinations	Notes
	0.000	0.000	KY 1861	Southern terminus
	2.266	3.647	KY 712 west (Old Jericho Road)	Eastern terminus of KY 712
	5.521	8.885	KY 146 (LaGrange Road)	
	5.832	9.386	I-71 – Louisville, Cincinnati	I-71 exit 28
	8.509	13.694	US 42 (Brownsboro Road)	Northern terminus
1.000 mi = 1.609 km; 1.000 km = 0.621 mi
