= Lincoln School (Canton, Missouri) =

- U.S. National Register of Historic Places
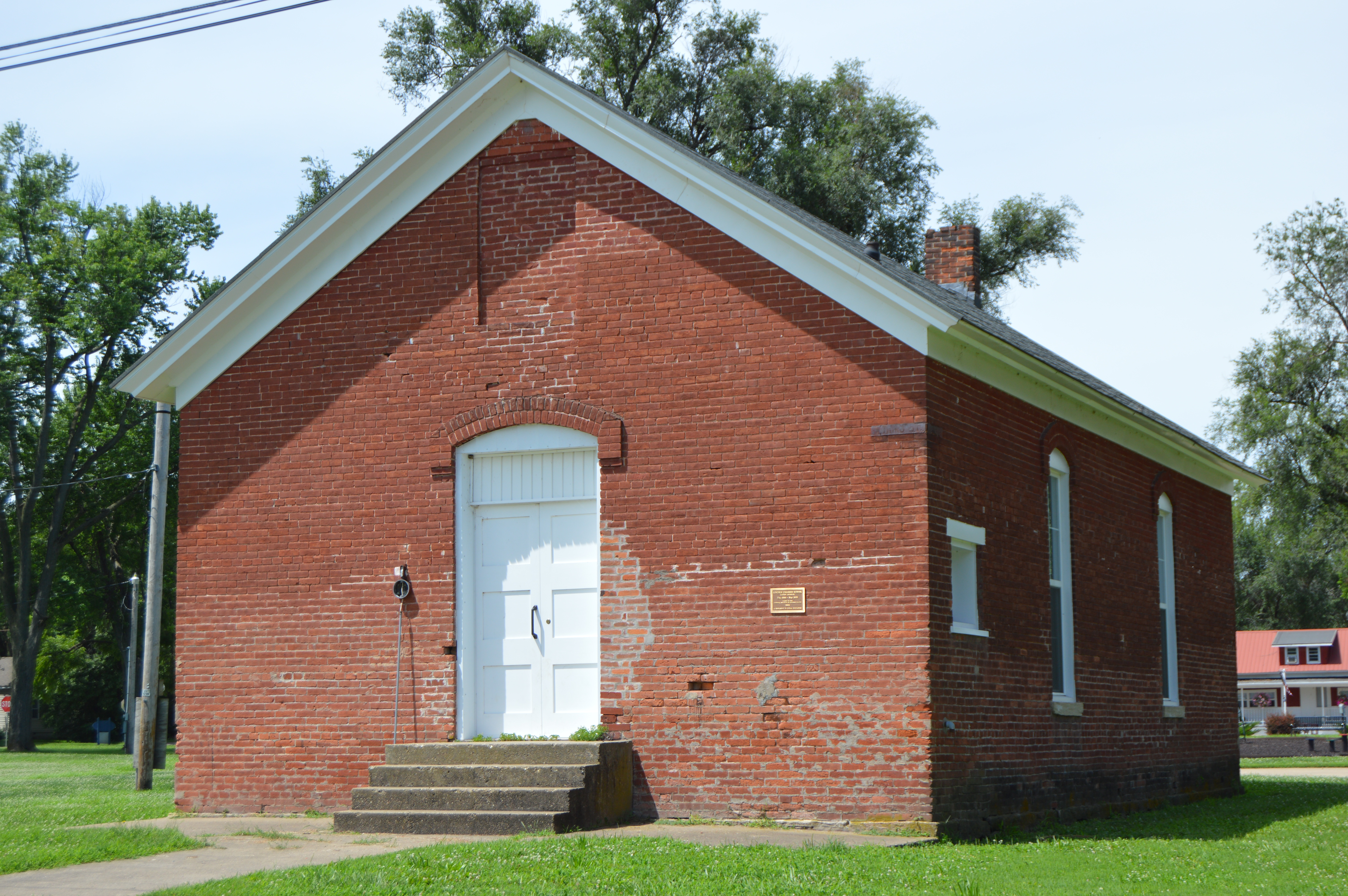
- Front and northern side

- Location within Missouri Location within the United States
- Location: MO B, Canton, Missouri
- Coordinates: 40°7′31″N 91°31′1″W
- Area: less than one acre
- Built: 1880
- NRHP reference No.: 83001029
- Added to NRHP: February 10, 1983

Lincoln School in Canton, Missouri is a former school for the African-American children of Canton and surrounding areas of Lewis County, Missouri. Built in 1880, it served the community until 1955 when it closed in the aftermath of the landmark Brown v. Board of Education ruling by the U.S. Supreme Court. The school was listed on the National Register of Historic Places in 1983. Currently only the exterior is available for public viewing.

== History ==
The education of African-American children in the Canton area dates to 1866 when the former post office was converted into classrooms. Students in grades one through eight were the primary focus, but some adults also attended. The school only lasted one year, however, as the Canton Board of Education could no longer afford the five dollar monthly rental on the building nor the fifty dollar per month salary of S.S. Sellers, the school's first teacher. A second effort was made in 1868 in a different location and a lower teacher salary. By 1870 the school had taken up residence in Canton's African Methodist Episcopal (AME) church. In an effort to provide at least some education opportunity to former slaves, adults were again allowed to attend provided they pay a dollar per month tuition.

The construction of a new school for Canton's white students in 1871 pointed out the glaring contrast in quality of educational facilities and caused resentment in the town's African-American community. Some repairs and upgrades were made to the AME church in 1872 but the discord continued. In 1880, the town's African-American residents presented a petition to the Canton Board of Education again asking for a better facility, this time prompting the forming of a committee to investigate the cost. In a special election held on May 1, 1880 Canton voters approved the expenditure of $800 for construction of a new colored school.

Bids were requested soon after the election, with the winning bid of $700 by J.S. Eaton being accepted. The finished structure was 42 feet by 24 feet, constructed of red brick walls 13 inches (330 mm) thick, set on a foundation of limestone blocks in ashlar. Outside ornamentation was limited, with a wooden floor interior. Due to repeated flooding by the nearby Mississippi River, the wooden floor became unusable and was later replaced with concrete. The school was constructed on land originally set aside as a public park. Indeed, today the surrounding area is known as Martin Park. Lincoln School's first teacher was M.L. Clay, hired at a salary of $35 per month. In addition to educating children during the day, at his own expense Clay taught night classes for adult African-Americans.

Teacher turnover was high throughout the history of Lincoln School, the exception being the school's first teacher of African-American race, Charles W. Lear. Mr. Lear taught for thirty-two of the school's seventy-five years of existence. Facilities were always sub-par compared to the white schools in Canton, with indoor toilets and electricity not added until 1924. With the exception of the adult remedial classes, only children up through grade eight were educated at Lincoln School. Until 1946, those seeking a high school diploma were left to their own devices. From 1946 until 1955, the Canton school board bussed African-American students in grades nine through twelve forty miles south to Hannibal, Missouri (an eighty-mile round trip) daily. Following the Brown v. Board of Education ruling, 1955 would be the last year for Lincoln School, the last classes held in May of that year, the final teacher being Mrs. Birdie Nickerson.

After 1955, the Lincoln School was used as a storage facility by the Canton R-5 school district and fell into a state of considerable disrepair. That began to change after its inclusion on the National Register of Historic Places on February 10, 1983, and further after the district donated the school to the City of Canton in 1995. In recent years a non-profit community group, Lincoln School Restoration Association, has taken over management and restoration efforts at the school. A commemorative plaque now adorns the exterior and an interpretive sign in front provides a brief history of the school. No public access is available at this time due to ongoing restoration. In popular culture, Lincoln School was the basis for the fictional Douglass School of Nutbush, Missouri in author Eleanora Tate's series of children's stories. Ms. Tate, a Canton native, attended first grade at Lincoln School in its final year of operation.
