= Crutcher House =

- U.S. National Register of Historic Places
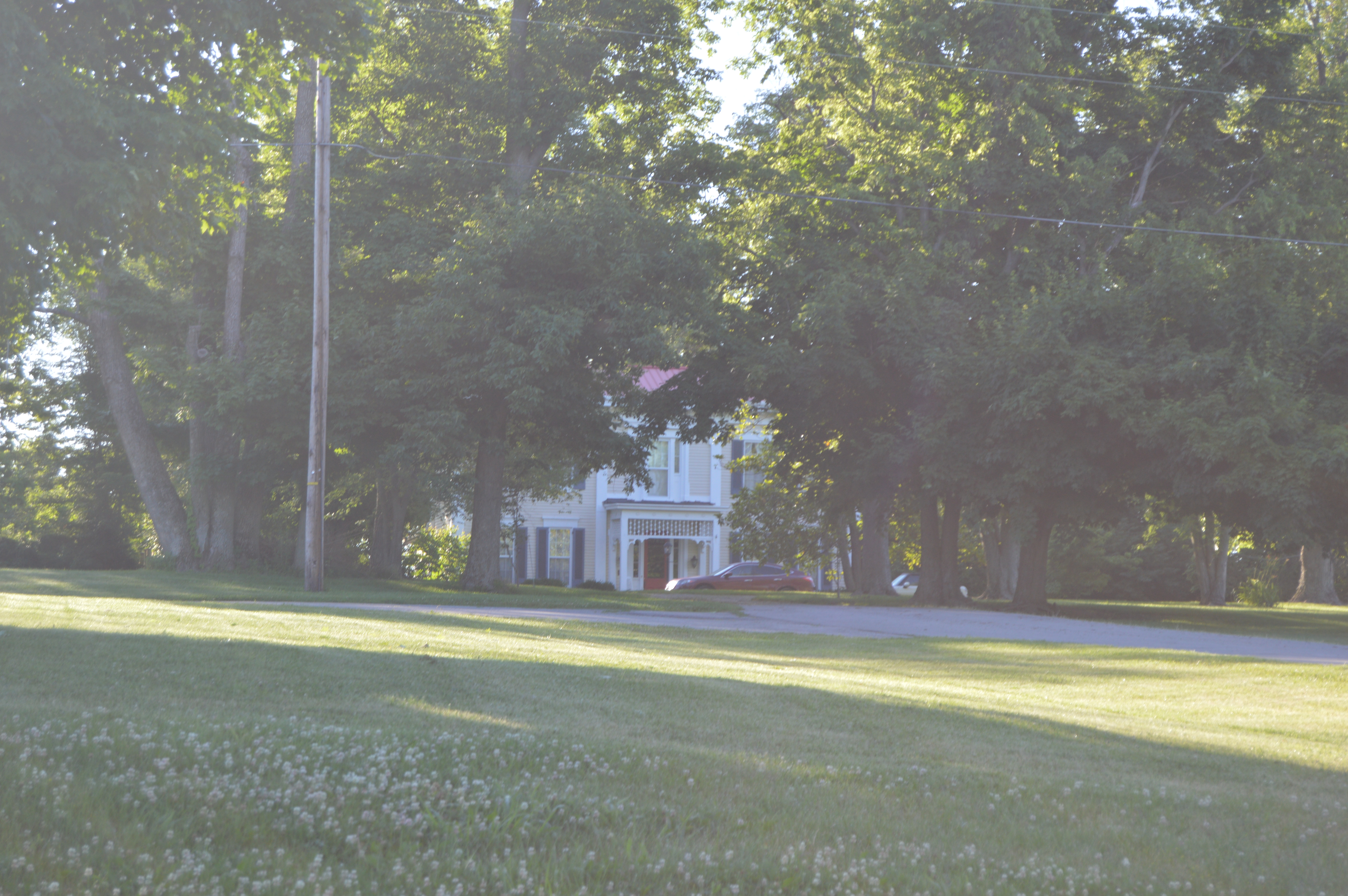

- Location within Kentucky Location within the United States
- Location: Mulberry Pike, Eminence, Kentucky
- Coordinates: 38°21′36″N 85°10′15″W
- Area: 4.3 acres (1.7 ha)
- Built: c.1870
- NRHP reference No.: 80001550
- Added to NRHP: December 8, 1980

Crutcher House, on Mulberry Pike in Eminence in Henry County, Kentucky, was listed on the National Register of Historic Places in 1980.

It is a five-bay two-story frame I-house which was built as a farmhouse in about 1870 in a then-rural setting. It has a two-story ell and a one-story addition (the latter added c.1968). It has Italianate brackets under its eaves, and pilasters at the entrance bay and at its four corners.

It was deemed significant as "the town's most significant remaining example of late 19th-century residential architecture."
