= Henderson Hall =

Henderson Hall may refer to:

United States:

- Henderson Hall (Arlington, Virginia), a U.S. Marine Corps facility near the Pentagon
- Henderson Hall (Canton, Missouri), listed on the National Register of Historic Places in Lewis County, Missouri
- Henderson Hall (Cookeville, Tennessee), listed on the NRHP in Putnam County, Tennessee
- Henderson Hall Historic District (Williamstown, West Virginia), listed on the NRHP in Wood County, West Virginia

England:

- Henderson Hall, Newcastle, residence hall at Newcastle University in Newcastle upon Tyne
- Henderson Hall, legal recruitment firm based in London

== See also ==
- Henderson House (disambiguation)
