= Pendleton, Kentucky =

Unincorporated community in Kentucky, United States

- Unincorporated community
- Location within Kentucky Location within the United States
- Coordinates: 38°27′44″N 85°18′13″W
- Country: United States
- State: Kentucky
- County: Henry
- Elevation: 853 ft (260 m)
- Time zone: UTC-5 (Eastern (EST))
  - Summer (DST): UTC-4 (EDT)
- ZIP code: 40055
- Area code: 502
- GNIS feature ID: 508798

Pendleton is an unincorporated community in Henry County, Kentucky, United States. The community is located along Kentucky Route 153 7.5 miles (12.1 km) west-northwest of New Castle. Pendleton has a post office with ZIP code 40055.
