= John M. Berry (Kentucky politician) =

American politician (1935–2016)

Majority Leader of the Kentucky Senate
- In office January 8, 1980 – January 1, 1982
- Whip: Lowell Hughes
- Preceded by: Tom Garrett
- Succeeded by: Joe Wright

Member of the Kentucky Senate from the 26th district
- In office January 1, 1974 – January 1, 1982
- Preceded by: Tom Harris
- Succeeded by: Louis Peniston

Personal details
- Born: October 13, 1935 New Castle, Kentucky, U.S.
- Died: October 27, 2016 (aged 81)
- Party: Democratic
- Relatives: Wendell Berry (brother)

John M. Berry Jr. (October 13, 1935 – October 27, 2016) was an American politician from Kentucky who was a member of the Kentucky Senate from 1974 to 1982, serving as majority leader of the body from 1980 to 1982. Berry was first elected in 1973, after incumbent senator Tom Harris resigned to become the Kentucky natural resources commissioner. He did not seek reelection in 1981.

He died in October 2016 at age 81.
