= Henry County Courthouse, Jail, and Warden's House =

Historic house in Kentucky, United States

- U.S. National Register of Historic Places
- U.S. Historic district – Contributing property
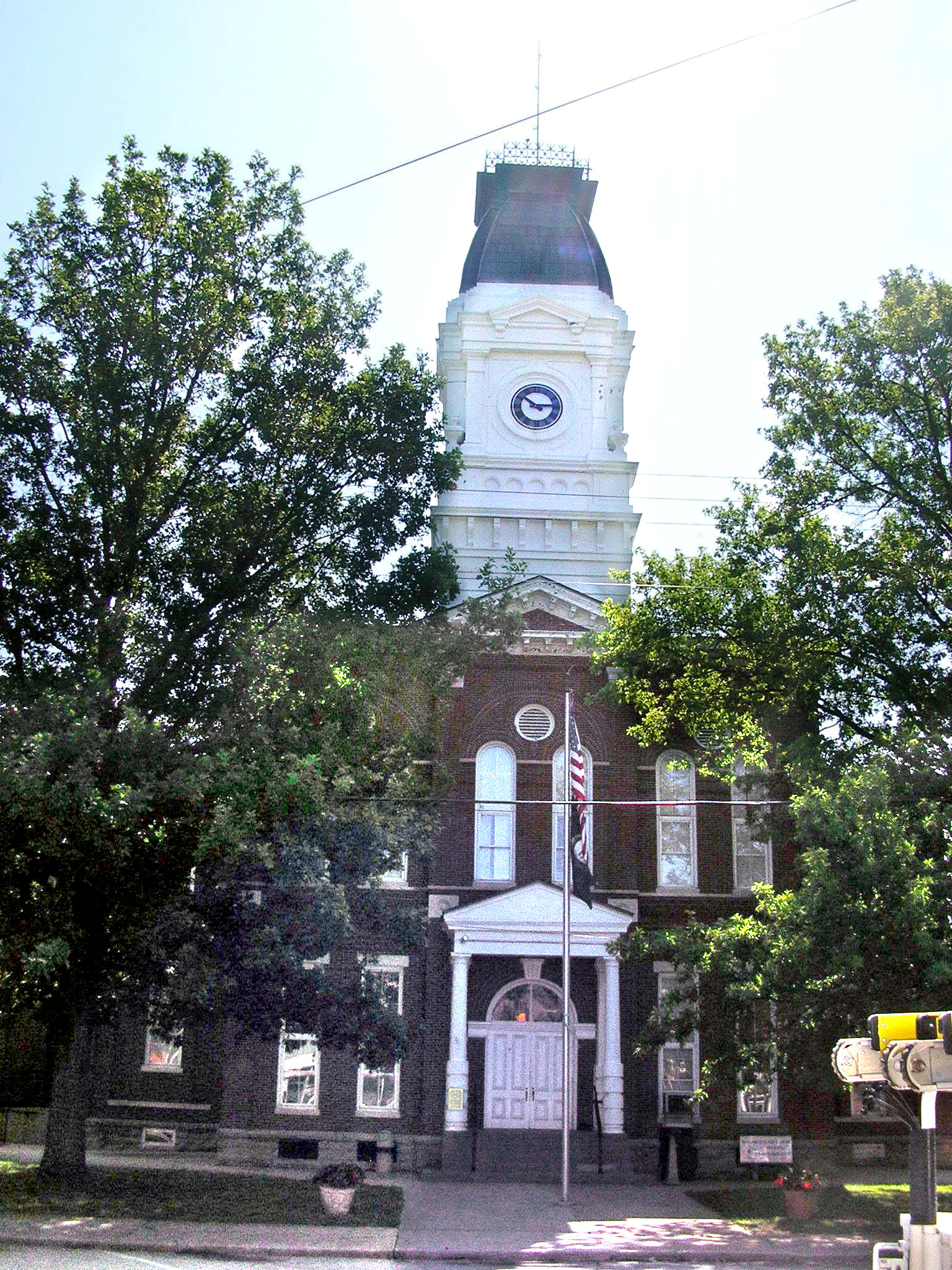
- Location: Courthouse Sq., New Castle, Kentucky
- Coordinates: 38°26′02″N 85°10′09″W
- Area: 2 acres (0.81 ha)
- Built: 1875
- Architect: McDonald Brothers
- Architectural style: Second Empire, Italianate, Romanesque
- Part of: New Castle Historic Commercial District (ID16000495)
- NRHP reference No.: 77000621

Significant dates
- Added to NRHP: April 11, 1977
- Designated CP: August 4, 2016

The Henry County Courthouse, Jail, and Warden's House in New Castle, Kentucky was built in 1875. It was designed by the McDonald Brothers in a mix of Italianate, Second Empire, and other styles. It was listed on the National Register of Historic Places in 1977.

It is a six-bay two-story brick building on a rusticated stone foundation. A stone jail and brick jailer's house extend to the rear, making the overall plan T-shaped.

In 2016, the building was listed as a contributing building to the New Castle Historic Commercial District.

== See also ==
- Marion County Jail and Jailor's House
- National Register of Historic Places listings in Henry County, Kentucky
