= New Castle Historic Commercial District =

- U.S. National Register of Historic Places
- U.S. Historic district
- Location within Kentucky Location within the United States
- Location: Main & Main Cross Sts., New Castle, Kentucky
- Coordinates: 38°26′00″N 85°10′12″W
- Area: 6.24 acres (2.53 ha)
- NRHP reference No.: 16000495
- Added to NRHP: August 4, 2016

The New Castle Historic Commercial District in New Castle, Kentucky is a historic district which was listed on the National Register of Historic Places in 2016.

The 6.24 acres (2.53 ha) listed area includes 29 contributing buildings. It includes the Italianate-style Henry County Courthouse, which was separately listed on the National Register in 1977.

New Castle's historic center is somewhat different from those of other Kentucky county seat towns, as it never had a railroad. Railroads reached most county seats by around 1920 and shaped development significantly. Most of the contributing buildings in the district are one- or two-story brick structures; three are log buildings.

== See also ==
- Eminence Historic Commercial District: the other historic district in Henry County, Kentucky
- National Register of Historic Places listings in Henry County, Kentucky
