= Kentucky's 26th Senate district =

American legislative district

Kentucky's 26th State Senate district
Senator
Karen Berg; D–Louisville
since July 13, 2020
- Registration: 52.6% Democratic; 34.9% Republican; 11.8% No party preference
- Demographics: 75.7% White; 11.3% Black; 6.0% Hispanic; 3.7% Asian; 0.2% Other; 3.2% Multiracial
- Population (2023): 111,932
- Registered voters (2025): 101,170

Kentucky's 26th Senatorial district is one of 38 districts in the Kentucky Senate. It comprises part of Jefferson County. It has been represented by Karen Berg (D–Louisville) since 2020. As of 2023, the district had a population of 111,932.

== Voter registration ==
On January 1, 2025, the district had 101,170 registered voters, who were registered with the following parties.

Party	Registration	
Party	Voters	%
Democratic	53,229	52.61
Republican	35,287	34.88
Independent	5,951	5.88
Libertarian	531	0.52
Green	103	0.10
Constitution	31	0.03
Socialist Workers	24	0.02
Reform	6	0.01
"Other"	6,008	5.94
Total	101,170	100.00
Source: Kentucky State Board of Elections

== Election results from statewide races ==
=== 2022 – present ===
Year	Office	Results (Note: Figures presented in this table are calculated by summing precinct election results published by the Kentucky State Board of Elections, using precinct data that list each precinct's senatorial district.)
2022	Senator	Booker 60.1 - 39.9%
2022	Amendment 1	No 68.2 - 31.8%
2022	Amendment 2	No 74.1 - 25.9%
2023	Governor	Beshear 70.6 - 29.4%
2023	Secretary of State	Wheatley 56.4 - 43.6%
2023	Attorney General	Stevenson 61.4 - 38.6%
2023	Auditor of Public Accounts	Reeder 58.3 - 41.7%
2023	State Treasurer	Bowman 62.2 - 37.8%
2023	Commissioner of Agriculture	Enlow 60.9 - 39.1%
2024	President	Harris 59.2 - 38.8%
2024	Amendment 1	Yes 51.9 - 48.1%
2024	Amendment 2	No 66.9 - 33.1%

== List of members representing the district ==
Member	Party	Years	Electoral history	District location
Tom Harris (Worthville)	Democratic	January 1, 1966 – January 1973	Elected in 1965. Reelected in 1969. Resigned to become the Kentucky; Natural Resources Commissioner.	1964–1972
Tom Harris (Worthville)	Democratic	January 1, 1966 – January 1973	Elected in 1965. Reelected in 1969. Resigned to become the Kentucky; Natural Resources Commissioner.	1972–1974
John M. Berry (New Castle)	Democratic	January 1, 1974 – January 1, 1982	Elected in 1973. Reelected in 1977. Retired.	1974–1984
Louis Peniston (New Castle)	Democratic	January 1, 1982 – January 1, 1991	Elected in 1981. Reelected in 1986. Lost renomination.	1974–1984
Louis Peniston (New Castle)	Democratic	January 1, 1982 – January 1, 1991	Elected in 1981. Reelected in 1986. Lost renomination.	1984–1993; Carroll, Gallatin, Grant, Henry, Oldham, Owen, Shelby (part), and Trimble Counties.
Rick Rand (Bedford)	Democratic	January 1, 1991 – January 1, 1995	Elected in 1990. Lost reelection.	1984–1993; Carroll, Gallatin, Grant, Henry, Oldham, Owen, Shelby (part), and Trimble Counties.
Rick Rand (Bedford)	Democratic	January 1, 1991 – January 1, 1995	Elected in 1990. Lost reelection.	1993–1997
Ernie Harris (Prospect)	Republican	January 1, 1995 – April 15, 2020	Elected in 1994. Reelected in 1998. Reelected in 2002. Reelected in 2006. Reelected in 2010. Reelected in 2014. Reelected in 2018. Resigned.	1993–1997
Ernie Harris (Prospect)	Republican	January 1, 1995 – April 15, 2020	Elected in 1994. Reelected in 1998. Reelected in 2002. Reelected in 2006. Reelected in 2010. Reelected in 2014. Reelected in 2018. Resigned.	1997–2003
Ernie Harris (Prospect)	Republican	January 1, 1995 – April 15, 2020	Elected in 1994. Reelected in 1998. Reelected in 2002. Reelected in 2006. Reelected in 2010. Reelected in 2014. Reelected in 2018. Resigned.	2003–2015
Ernie Harris (Prospect)	Republican	January 1, 1995 – April 15, 2020	Elected in 1994. Reelected in 1998. Reelected in 2002. Reelected in 2006. Reelected in 2010. Reelected in 2014. Reelected in 2018. Resigned.	2015–2023
Karen Berg (Louisville)	Democratic	July 13, 2020 – present	Elected to finish Harris's term. Reelected in 2022. Reelected in 2026.	2015–2023
Karen Berg (Louisville)	Democratic	July 13, 2020 – present	Elected to finish Harris's term. Reelected in 2022. Reelected in 2026.	2023–present
