= Benjamin F. Shields =

American politician

Speaker of the Kentucky House of Representatives
- In office 1940–1942
- Preceded by: John M. Kirtley
- Succeeded by: Stanley S. Dickson

Member of the Kentucky Senate from the 20th district
- In office 1954–1958

Member of the Kentucky House of Representatives from the 52nd district
- In office 1952–1954

Member of the Kentucky House of Representatives from the 33rd district
- In office 1940–1942
- In office 1936–1938
- In office 1932–1934
- In office 1920–1922

Personal details
- Born: January 2, 1881 Nelson County, Kentucky, U.S.
- Died: March 11, 1969 (aged 88) Shelbyville, Kentucky, U.S.
- Party: Democratic
- Spouse: Ardia May Milligan

Benjamin F. Shields (January 2, 1881 – March 11, 1969) was an American politician and physician who served as Speaker of the Kentucky House of Representatives from 1940 to 1942.

== Early life and education ==
Shields was born on January 2, 1881, in Nelson County, Kentucky, to Elizabeth (née Green) and Benjamin F. Shields. He was educated at Kentucky University and Hospital Collage of Medicine in Louisville, and was married to Ardia May Milligan on April 17, 1919.

== Death ==
He died in 1969 at Kings's Daughters Hospital in Shelbyville, Kentucky.
