= Bob Heleringer =

American politician

Member of the Kentucky House of Representatives from the 33rd district
- In office January 1, 1980 – January 1, 2003
- Preceded by: Bob Benson
- Succeeded by: Ronald Crimm

Personal details
- Born: May 14, 1951 (age 75) Louisville, Kentucky, U.S.
- Party: Republican
- Relatives: Robin Westman (nephew)

Robert Leo Heleringer (born May 14, 1951) is an American politician. A member of the Republican Party, he served in the Kentucky House of Representatives from 1980 to 2003.

In 1979, Heleringer was elected to represent 33rd district of the Kentucky House of Representatives, defeating Democratic incumbent Bob Benson. In 2002, he retired from the house after 47th district incumbent Ronald Crimm was drawn into the 33rd district. He wrote articles for The Courier Journal.

In August 2025, Heleringer stated that he was the uncle of the suspect in the Annunciation Catholic School shooting in Minneapolis, Robin Westman.
