= Ronald Crimm =

American politician (1935–2022)

Member of the Kentucky House of Representatives
- In office January 1, 1997 – January 1, 2017
- Preceded by: Jon Ackerson
- Succeeded by: Jason Nemes
- Constituency: 47th district (1997–2003); 33rd district (2003–2017)

Personal details
- Born: March 11, 1935 West Lawn, Pennsylvania, U.S.
- Died: August 25, 2022 (aged 87)
- Resting place: Middletown Historical Cemetery
- Party: Republican
- Spouse: Phyllis Jane (m. 1958, died)
- Children: 2
- Education: Shippensburg State Teachers College
- Occupation: businessman

Ronald E. Crimm (March 11, 1935 – August 25, 2022) was an American politician from Kentucky.

== Early life ==
Ronald E. Crimm was born on March 11, 1935, in West Lawn, Pennsylvania, to Jean (née Whitwam) and Ralph Crimm. He graduated from Shippensburg State Teachers College in 1957.

== Career ==
Crimm taught business education at Penncrest High School. He then worked in insurance.

Crimm served in the Kentucky House of Representatives, which he was initially elected to in 1996, and was defeated in the 2016 primary by Jason Nemes. A Republican, he represented the 33rd district. He was an alumnus of Shippensburg University, which he graduated from in business in 1957. Prior to his election to the house, he was chairman of the Jefferson County Republican Party, assuming the position in 1993. He was a former manager, teacher, and owner of Crimm Insurance.

== Personal life ==
Crimm married Phyllis Jane on August 23, 1958. His wife predeceased him. They had two children, Cynthia and Scott. He was a member of the Middletown United Methodist Church.

Crimm died on August 25, 2022. He was buried at Middletown Historical Cemetery.

Kentucky House of Representatives
Preceded by Jon Ackerson	Member of the Kentucky House of Representatives from the 47th district 1997–2003	Succeeded by Rick Rand
Preceded by Bob Heleringer	Member of the Kentucky House of Representatives from the 33rd district 2003–2017	Succeeded by Jason Nemes
