= Jennifer Hardin =

Kentucky politician

Member-elect of the Kentucky House of Representatives from the 33rd district
- Assuming office January 1, 2027
- Succeeding: Jason Nemes

Personal details
- Born: August 15, 1983 (age 43)
- Party: Democratic

Jennifer Layne Hardin (born August 15, 1983) is an American politician who is a member-elect of the Kentucky House of Representatives. Her term will begin in January 2027. She will represent the 33rd district, which comprises parts of Jefferson, Oldham, and Shelby counties.

== Political career ==
Hancock was elected in the 2026 Kentucky House of Representatives election, defeating incumbent Republican representative Jason Nemes for reelection. She previously defeated candidate Tarah Combs LeBlanc in the May primary election.

== Electoral history ==
=== 2026 ===
Democratic primary results
Party	Candidate	Votes	%
Democratic	Jennifer Hardin	2,930	65.49
Democratic	Tarah Combs LeBlanc	1,544	34.51
Total votes		4,474	100.0

2026 Kentucky's 33rd House of Representatives district election
Party	Candidate	Votes	%
Democratic	Jennifer Hardin	9,857	51.39
Republican	Jason Michael Nemes (incumbent)	9,323	48.61
Total votes		19,180	100.0
Democratic gain from Republican			
