= Isham Henderson House =

- U.S. National Register of Historic Places
- Location within Kentucky Location within the United States
- Location: Main Cross Rd., New Castle, Kentucky
- Coordinates: 38°26′11″N 85°09′36″W
- Area: 59 acres (24 ha)
- Built: c. 1830
- Architectural style: Greek Revival, Federal, Transitional Federal-Greek
- MPS: Early Stone Buildings of Kentucky Outer Bluegrass and Pennyrile TR
- NRHP reference No.: 87000156
- Added to NRHP: January 8, 1987

The Isham Henderson House, on Main Cross Rd. in New Castle in Henry County, Kentucky, was built c. 1830. It was listed on the National Register of Historic Places in 1987. The listing included two contributing buildings (a stone house and a frame dependency) and a contributing structure (a root cellar).

The house is a six-bay one-story hip roof dry stone house with a rear ell. It has nine-stone voussoirs without keystones. It had Federal/Greek transitional-style woodwork.
