= Eminence Historic Commercial District =

- U.S. National Register of Historic Places
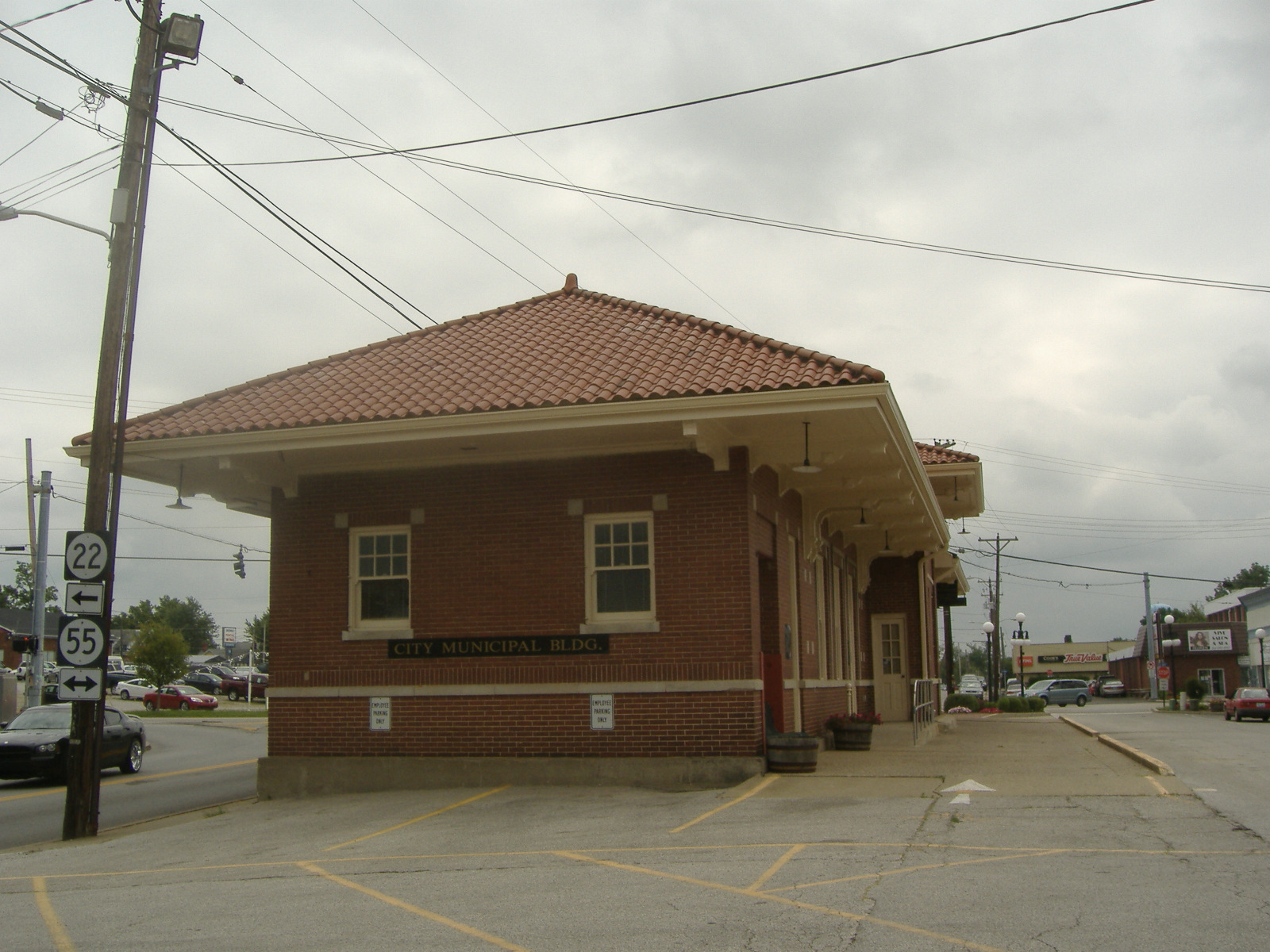

- Location within Kentucky Location within the United States
- Location: Broadway, Main and Penn Sts., Eminence, Kentucky
- Coordinates: 38°22′11″N 85°10′48″W
- Area: 12 acres (4.9 ha)
- Architect: Multiple
- NRHP reference No.: 79000994
- Added to NRHP: February 9, 1979

The Eminence Historic Commercial District is a 12 acres (4.9 ha) historic district in Eminence, Kentucky which was listed on the National Register of Historic Places in 1979. It included 25 contributing buildings.

Specifically it includes:

- 116 E. Broadway,
- 64-80 S. Main,
- 112-102 S. Penn,
- 122-108 E. Broadway,
- 100-124 N. Main,
- 123 N. Main, and
- 100 W. Broadway.

It includes the former L&N Railroad Depot (1908), a brick building at the intersection of Broadway and Main.

It was deemed "significant in being a fine collection of late 19th-century commercial buildings which has retained its architectural integrity. The buildings combine with the arrangement of streets speak of the importance of the former railroad, which existed ten years before the founding of the town."

== See also ==
- New Castle Historic Commercial District: the other historic district in Henry County, Kentucky
- National Register of Historic Places listings in Henry County, Kentucky
