= Louis Peniston =

American politician

Member of the Kentucky Senate from the 26th district
- In office January 1, 1982 – January 1, 1991
- Preceded by: John M. Berry
- Succeeded by: Rick Rand

Personal details
- Born: March 5, 1919
- Died: January 13, 2005 (aged 85)
- Party: Democratic

Louis T. Peniston (March 5, 1919 – January 13, 2005) was an American politician from Kentucky who was a member of the Kentucky Senate from 1982 to 1991. He was previously an intermittent member of the Kentucky House of Representatives, serving in the sessions of 1946, 1952–1954, 1960–1966, and 1972. Peniston was first elected to the senate in 1981 after incumbent senator John M. Berry retired. He was defeated for renomination in 1990 by Rick Rand.

He died on January 13, 2005, at age 85.
