= Rick Rand =

American politician

Member of the Kentucky House of Representatives from the 47th district
- In office January 1, 2003 – January 1, 2021
- Preceded by: Ronald Crimm (redistricting)
- Succeeded by: Felicia Rabourn

Member of the Kentucky Senate from the 26th district
- In office January 1, 1991 – January 1, 1995
- Preceded by: Louis Peniston
- Succeeded by: Ernie Harris

Personal details
- Born: March 10, 1957 (age 69) La Grange, Kentucky
- Party: Democratic
- Education: Hanover College
- Website: rickrand.com

Reginald Wayne Rand (born March 10, 1957) is an American politician and was a Democratic member of the Kentucky House of Representatives representing District 47 from January 2003 to January 2021 after not running for reelection. Rand served non-consecutively in the Kentucky General Assembly from January 1991 to January 1995 in the Kentucky Senate District 26.

Rand was elected to the Kentucky Senate in 1990, defeating incumbent Democratic senator Louis Peniston for renomination. He was defeated for reelection in 1994 by Republican Ernie Harris. He was first elected to the house in 2002 following the state's redistricting creating an open seat. He did not seek reelection in 2020.

Rand currently serves as Commissioner of the Kentucky Department of Housing, Buildings, and Construction.

== Education ==
Rand earned his BA from Hanover College.

== Elections ==
- 2012 Rand and returning 2010 Republican challenger Theodore Broecker both won their May 22, 2012 primaries, setting up a rematch; Rand won November 6, 2012 General election with 11,216 votes (60.5%) against Broecker.
- 1990s Rand was elected to the District 26 seat of the Kentucky Senate in the November 6, 1990 and November 3, 1992, General elections, but lost the November 8, 1994 General election to Republican nominee Ernie Harris.
- 2002 With District 47 incumbent Representative Ronald Crimm redistricted to District 33, Rand won the three-way 2002 Democratic Primary with 4,877 votes (49.4%) and won the November 5, 2002 General election with 7,369 votes (58.4%) against Republican nominee Pamela Foree, who had run for Kentucky Senate in 1994.
- 2004 Rand was challenged in the 2004 Democratic Primary, winning with 2,680 votes (61.2%) and was unopposed for the November 2, 2004 General election, winning with 12,125 votes.
- 2006 Rand was unopposed for both the 2006 Democratic Primary and the November 7, 2006 General election, winning with 10,197 votes.
- 2008 Rand was unopposed for both the 2008 Democratic Primary and the November 4, 2008 General election, winning with 14,559 votes.
- 2010 Rand was unopposed for the May 18, 2010 Democratic Primary and won the November 2, 2010 General election with 9,489 votes (61.5%) against Republican nominee Theodore Broecker.
