= Jason Nemes =

American politician

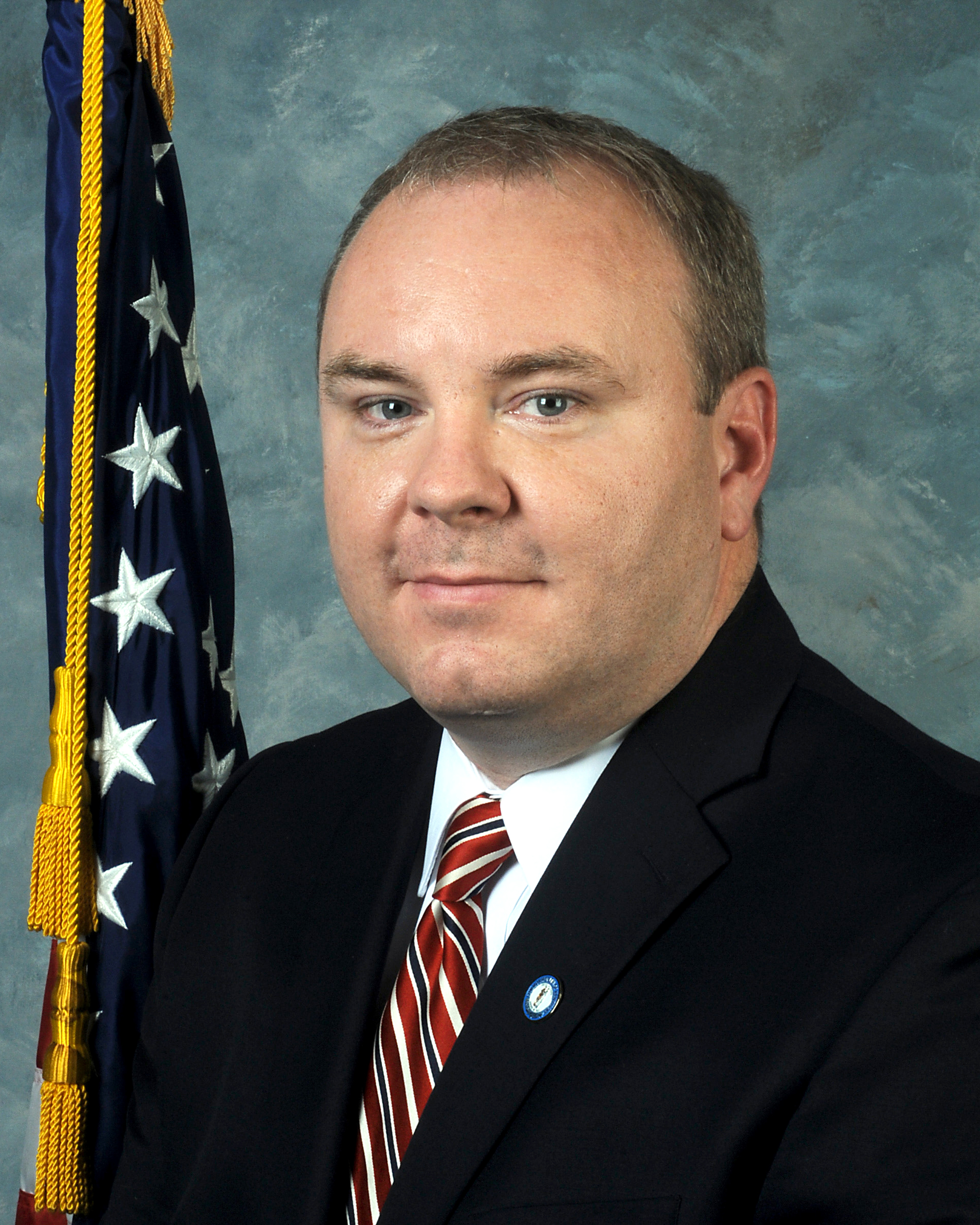

Majority Whip of the Kentucky House of Representatives
- In office November 17, 2022 – November 10, 2026
- Preceded by: Chad McCoy
- Succeeded by: Josh Bray

Member of the Kentucky House of Representatives from the 33rd district
- Incumbent
- Assumed office January 1, 2017
- Preceded by: Ronald Crimm

Personal details
- Born: March 27, 1978 (age 48) Louisville, Kentucky
- Party: Republican
- Relatives: Michael J. Nemes (father)
- Education: Western Kentucky University (BA); University of Louisville Louis D. Brandeis School of Law (JD)
- Committees: Committee on Committees; Judiciary; Rules

Jason Michael Nemes (born March 27, 1978) is an American politician who has served as a Republican member in the Kentucky House of Representatives from Kentucky's 33rd House district since 2017. He served as House majority whip from 2022 to 2026. Nemes was defeated for reelection in 2026, losing to Democratic candidate Jennifer Hardin.

== Background ==
Nemes graduated from DuPont Manual High School before attending Western Kentucky University where he earned a Bachelor of Science in government and sociology in 2000. He earned a Juris Doctor from the University of Louisville Brandeis School of Law in 2004.

After law school, Nemes became the Chief of Staff for the Office of the Chief Justice of the Commonwealth of Kentucky. He went to serve as Director of the Administrative Office of the Courts, the highest unelected position in the Kentucky Court of Justice. He also served as an adjunct professor at his alma mater, UofL's Brandeis School of Law, teaching courses in constitutional law.

Nemes has been a member of numerous law firms including Dinsmore & Shohl LLP, Commonwealth Counsel Group, and Nemes Eade PLLC.

Nemes' father, Michael J. Nemes, currently serves as a member of the Kentucky Senate representing the Kentucky's 38th Senate district. He previously served as a member of the Kentucky House from 2011 to 2013 representing the Kentucky's 38th House district.

== Political career ==
=== Leadership ===
On November 17, 2022, Nemes was selected by the Republican caucus to replace retiring House Majority Whip Chad McCoy.

=== 2026 impeachment committee ===
During the 2026 Kentucky General Assembly, Nemes served as chairman of the House Impeachment Committee. In total, the committee received five petitions:

- Stephania J. Perlow, chief circuit judge of Kentucky's 42nd judicial circuit
- Pamela R. Goodwine, justice of the Kentucky Supreme Court
- Eric Copess, jailer of Ballard County
- Julie Goodman, circuit judge of Kentucky's 22nd judicial circuit
- Tyler Murphy, chairman of the Fayette County Board of Education

Aside from the petition against Goodman, the committee dismissed all petitions.

Following a lengthy hearing, the committee approved five articles of impeachment against Goodman for various abuses of power, which Nemes presented to the House on March 20 as HR 124. The resolution passed 73–14 primarily along party lines. He was set to be an impeachment manager during Goodman's Senate trial before it was enjoined from proceeding by the Kentucky Supreme Court.

=== Elections ===
- 2016 Nemes won the 2016 Republican primary with 1,574 votes (51.5%), unseating incumbent representative Ronald Crimm, and won the 2016 Kentucky House of Representatives election with 14,146 votes (55.6%) against Democratic candidate Rob Walker.
- 2018 Nemes was unopposed in the 2018 Republican primary, and won the 2018 Kentucky House of Representatives election with 11,056 votes (51%) against Democratic candidate Rob Walker.
- 2020 Nemes was unopposed in the 2020 Republican primary, and won the 2020 Kentucky House of Representatives election with 15,186 (54.1%) against Democratic candidate Margarett Plattner.
- 2022 Nemes was unopposed in the 2022 Republican primary, and won the 2022 Kentucky House of Representatives election with 10,846 votes (55.2%) against Democratic candidate Kate Turner.
- 2024 Nemes was unopposed in the 2024 Republican primary and won the 2024 Kentucky House of Representatives election with 14,349 votes (56.9%) against Democratic candidate Taylor Jolly.
