= Eleanora E. Tate =

American author and educator (born 1948)

- Born: 1948 (age 77–78); Canton, Missouri, U.S.
- Education: Drake University
- Occupations: Author; educator

Eleanora Elaine Tate (born 1948) is an American author and educator. Notably, she has written books and short stories for children and young adults and also worked as a newspaper reporter.

A native of Canton, Missouri, she attended Drake University, graduating in 1973 with a degree in journalism. Her first novel, Just an Overnight Guest (1980), was optioned for television and released as a television movie on Nickelodeon and PBS WonderWorks. The American Library Association added the film to its 1985 list of Selected Films for Young Adults. Subsequent books received multiple awards: The Secret of Gumbo Grove (1987) was awarded a "gold seal" from the Parents' Choice Award, Thank You, Dr. Martin Luther King, Jr.! (1990) was named Children's Book of the Year by the National Council for the Social Studies, and A Blessing in Disguise (1995) was an American Booksellers Association "Pick of the List".

Among other honors, she has received the Zora Neale Hurston Award and the Circle of Elders Award from the National Association of Black Storytellers (of which she was formerly president), and, from North Carolina Central University, the Dr. Annette Lewis Phinazee Award. The South Carolina House of Representatives and Senate cited her in 2000 for contributions to literature and social activism.

== Books ==
- Just An Overnight Guest 1980
- The Secret of Gumbo Grove 1987
- Thank You, Dr. Martin Luther King, Jr.! 1990
- Front Porch Stories at the One-Room School 1992
- Retold African Myths 1993
- A Blessing in Disguise 1995
- Don’t Split the Pole: Tales of Down-Home Wisdom 1997
- Black Stars: African American Musicians 2000
- The Minstrel’s Melody 2001
- To Be Free 2004
- Celeste’s Harlem Renaissance 2007
