= Turners Station, Kentucky =

Unincorporated community in Kentucky, United States

- Unincorporated community
- Location within Kentucky Location within the United States
- Coordinates: 38°33′20″N 85°10′4″W
- Country: United States
- State: Kentucky
- County: Henry
- Elevation: 781 ft (238 m)
- Time zone: UTC-5 (Eastern (EST))
  - Summer (DST): UTC-4 (EDT)
- ZIP codes: 40075
- GNIS feature ID: 505670

Turners Station is an unincorporated community within Henry County, Kentucky, United States.

== History ==
Turners Station was a station on the Louisville and Cincinnati Railroad. A post office was established at Turners Station in 1879, and remained in operation until it was discontinued in 1995.
