= Eminence, Kentucky =

- City
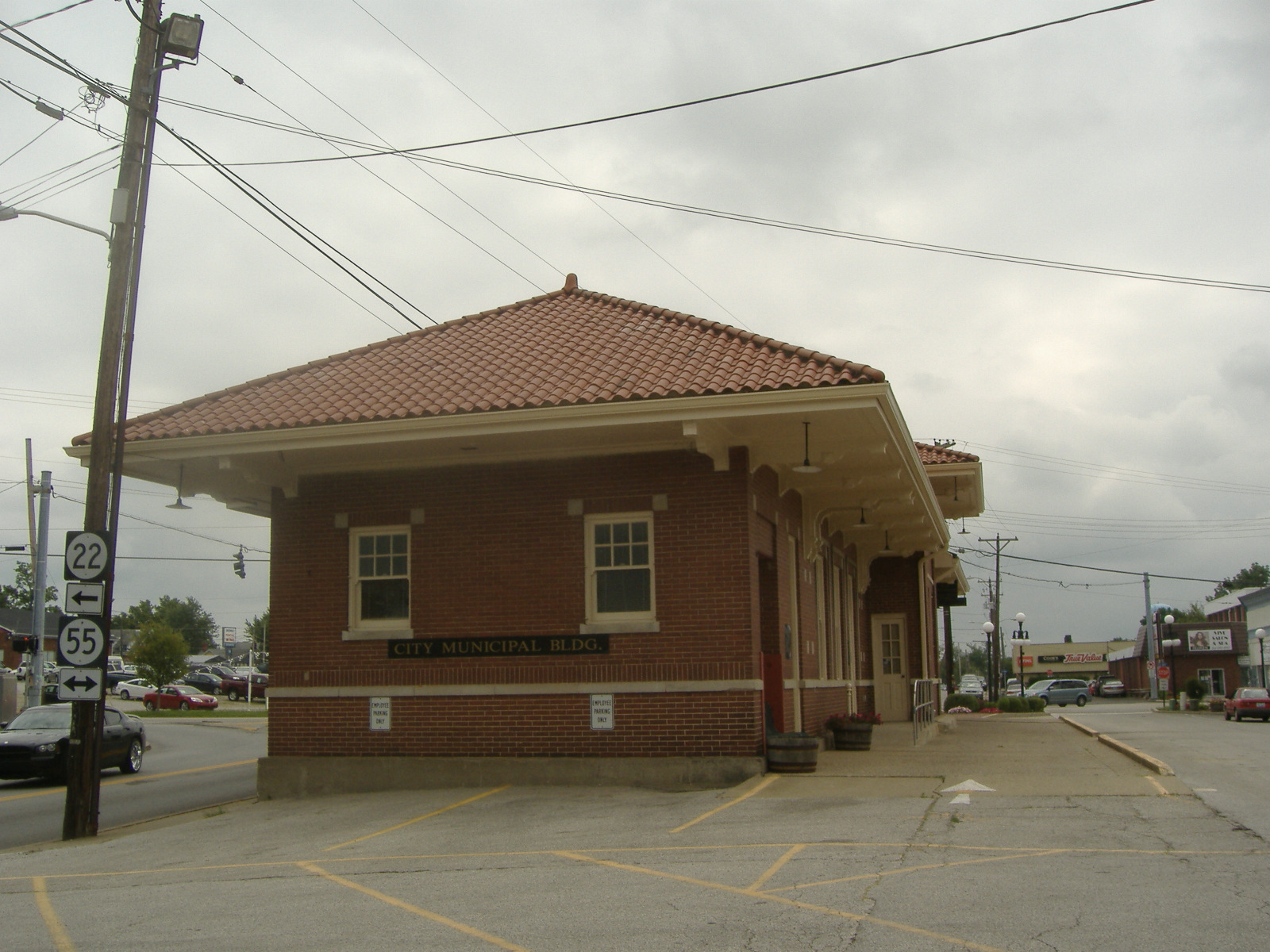
- City Municipal Building in Eminence, once a railroad depot

- Location of Eminence in Henry County, Kentucky.
- Coordinates: 38°21′49″N 85°10′40″W
- Country: United States
- State: Kentucky
- County: Henry

Government
  - Mayor: Fred Downey

Area
  - Total: 2.90 sq mi (7.50 km^{2})
  - Land: 2.85 sq mi (7.37 km^{2})
  - Water: 0.050 sq mi (0.13 km^{2})
- Elevation: 922 ft (281 m)

Population (2020)
  - Total: 2,705
  - Estimate (2024): 2,787
  - Density: 950.8/sq mi (367.09/km^{2})
- Time zone: UTC−5 (Eastern (EST))
  - Summer (DST): UTC−4 (EDT)
- ZIP Code: 40019
- Area code: 502
- FIPS code: 21-24904
- GNIS feature ID: 2403564
- Website: eminence.ky.gov

Eminence is a home rule class city in Henry County, Kentucky, in the United States. As of the 2020 census, Eminence had a population of 2,705. It is home to the Eminence Historic Commercial District. Eminence is the largest city in Henry County. Eminence is home to the loudspeaker manufacturing company, Eminence Speaker. The area was home to Eminence Male and Female High School which grew to become Eminence College. Eminence's school teams compete as the Warriors.

== History ==
The area post office, established in 1836, was moved to Eminence in 1850, and named for its supposed location at the highest point on the railroad line between Louisville and Lexington. The city was formally incorporated in 1851.

The Eminence Historic Commercial District was listed on the National Register of Historic Places in 1979.

== Geography ==
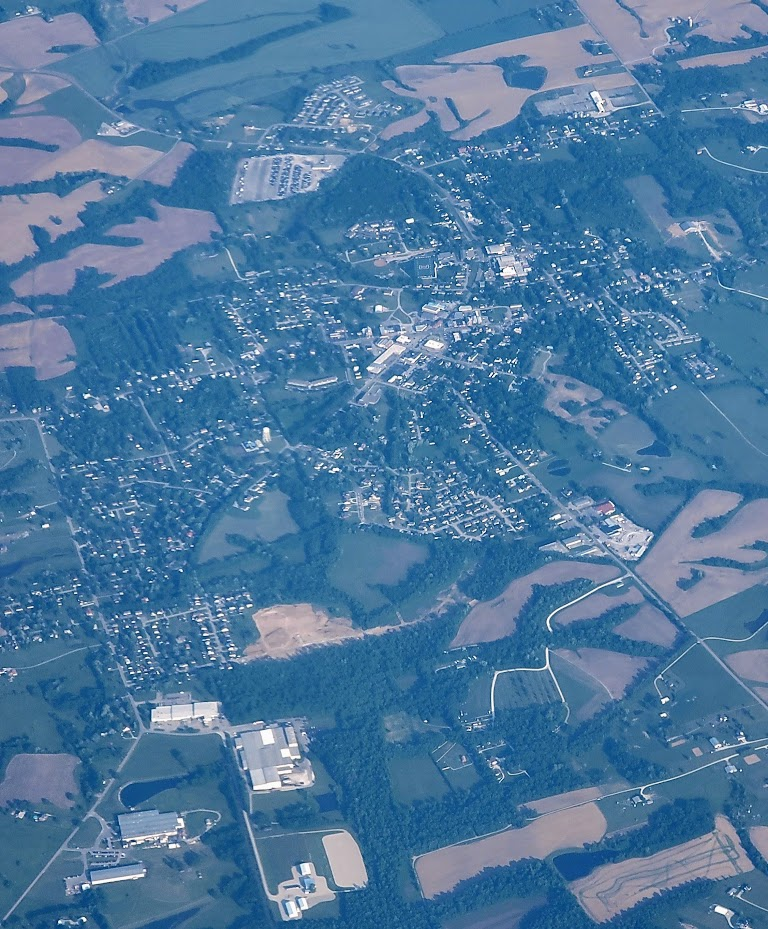
Eminence as seen from above

Eminence is located in southern Henry County and is bordered to the south by Shelby County.

Kentucky Route 55 is Main Street through Eminence. KY 55 leads north 4 miles (6 km) to New Castle, the Henry County seat, and south 12 miles (19 km) to Shelbyville. U.S. Route 421 passes 2 miles (3 km) east of Eminence; it leads north to New Castle and southeast 25 miles (40 km) to Frankfort, the state capital.

According to the United States Census Bureau, the city of Eminence has a total area of 2.9 square miles (7.4 km^{2}), of which 0.04 square miles (0.1 km^{2}), or 1.70%, is water. The city is located on high ground, with elevations up to 960 feet (290 m), where several watersheds converge. The source of the Little Kentucky River, a tributary of the Kentucky River, is just west of Eminence, while Town Creek to the north and Drennon Creek to the east also rise in Eminence and flow north to the Kentucky River. Fox Run rises in the southern part of Eminence and flows south via Bullskin Creek and Brashears Creek to the Salt River. The Kentucky and the Salt River are both tributaries of the Ohio River.

== Demographics ==
Historical population
Census	Pop.	Note	%±
1880	1,043		—
1890	1,002		−3.9%
1900	1,018		1.6%
1910	1,274		25.1%
1920	1,317		3.4%
1930	1,323		0.5%
1940	1,411		6.7%
1950	1,462		3.6%
1960	1,958		33.9%
1970	2,225		13.6%
1980	2,260		1.6%
1990	2,055		−9.1%
2000	2,231		8.6%
2010	2,498		12.0%
2020	2,705		8.3%
2024 (est.)	2,787		3.0%
U.S. Decennial Census

=== 2020 census ===
As of the 2020 census, Eminence had a population of 2,705. The median age was 37.2 years. 26.5% of residents were under the age of 18 and 16.7% of residents were 65 years of age or older. For every 100 females there were 93.9 males, and for every 100 females age 18 and over there were 84.0 males age 18 and over.

0.0% of residents lived in urban areas, while 100.0% lived in rural areas.

There were 1,080 households in Eminence, of which 36.4% had children under the age of 18 living in them. Of all households, 37.4% were married-couple households, 15.4% were households with a male householder and no spouse or partner present, and 36.5% were households with a female householder and no spouse or partner present. About 29.1% of all households were made up of individuals and 13.7% had someone living alone who was 65 years of age or older.

There were 1,131 housing units, of which 4.5% were vacant. The homeowner vacancy rate was 1.4% and the rental vacancy rate was 2.3%.

Racial composition as of the 2020 census
Race	Number	Percent
White	2,171	80.3%
Black or African American	198	7.3%
American Indian and Alaska Native	4	0.1%
Asian	11	0.4%
Native Hawaiian and Other Pacific Islander	0	0.0%
Some other race	119	4.4%
Two or more races	202	7.5%
Hispanic or Latino (of any race)	202	7.5%

=== 2000 census ===
As of the census of 2000, there were 2,231 people, 944 households, and 623 families residing in the city. The population density was 1,039.2 inhabitants per square mile (401.2/km^{2}). There were 998 housing units at an average density of 464.9 per square mile (179.5/km^{2}). The racial makeup of the city was 83.59% White, 11.65% Black or African American, 0.31% Native American, 0.36% Asian, 2.11% from other races, and 1.97% from two or more races. Hispanic or Latino of any race were 3.81% of the population.

There were 944 households, out of which 30.8% had children under the age of 18 living with them, 42.4% were married couples living together, 18.0% had a female householder with no husband present, and 34.0% were non-families. 30.6% of all households were made up of individuals, and 12.9% had someone living alone who was 65 years of age or older. The average household size was 2.36 and the average family size was 2.91.

In the city, the population was spread out, with 25.3% under the age of 18, 9.6% from 18 to 24, 28.2% from 25 to 44, 22.1% from 45 to 64, and 14.8% who were 65 years of age or older. The median age was 36 years. For every 100 females, there were 89.1 males. For every 100 females age 18 and over, there were 82.4 males.

The median income for a household in the city was $30,323, and the median income for a family was $36,053. Males had a median income of $30,893 versus $21,042 for females. The per capita income for the city was $15,337. About 14.9% of families and 17.1% of the population were below the poverty line, including 21.0% of those under age 18 and 21.5% of those age 65 or over.

== Education ==
Education in Eminence is administered by the Eminence Independent School District. Eminence's school mascot is the Warriors. They have played the Eels of Eminence Junior-Senior High School in the Eminence, Indiana.

Eminence has a lending library, the Henry County Public Library.

== Arts and culture ==
The city is home to the Highland Renaissance Festival, which runs from May through July. Eminence also hosts a Celtic Fest in September.

== Notable people ==
- Anne Braden (1924–2006), civil rights activist
- Jim Green, track star and first African American athlete to graduate from the University of Kentucky
- Hollis Summers, (1916–1987), poet, novelist, short story writer
