= Kentucky's 33rd House of Representatives district =

American legislative district

Kentucky's 33rd State House of Representatives district
Representative
Jason Nemes; R–Middletown
since January 1, 2017
- Registration: 47.5% Republican; 40.1% Democratic; 11.8% No party preference
- Demographics: 83.2% White; 7.3% Black; 2.7% Hispanic; 3.4% Asian; 0.1% Native American; 0.5% Other; 2.8% Multiracial
- Population (2023): 43,056
- Registered voters (2025): 39,737

Kentucky's 33rd Representative district is one of 100 districts in the Kentucky House of Representatives. It comprises parts of Jefferson, Oldham, and Shelby Counties. It has been represented by Jason Nemes (R–Middletown) since 2017. As of 2023, the district had a population of 43,056.

== Voter registration ==
On January 1, 2025, the district had 39,737 registered voters, who were registered with the following parties.

Party	Registration	
Party	Voters	%
Republican	18,865	47.47
Democratic	15,947	40.13
Independent	2,426	6.11
Libertarian	196	0.49
Green	28	0.07
Constitution	12	0.03
Socialist Workers	7	0.02
Reform	3	0.01
"Other"	2,253	5.67
Total	39,737	100.00
Source: Kentucky State Board of Elections

== List of members representing the district (1894–present) ==
Representative	Party	Years	Counties
J. C. B. Joyce	Democratic	1894–1896	Hart
J. B. Carpenter	Republican	1896–1898	Hart
R. E. Richardson	Democratic	1898–1900	Hart
Claiborne J. Walton	Republican	1900–1902	Hart
Ben L. Bruner	Republican	1902–1904	Hart
S. F. Middleton	Democratic	1904–1906	Hart
Henry W. Curle	Democratic	1906–1908	Hart
William H. Strange	Republican	1908–1910	Hart
S. F. Crabtree	Democratic	1910–1912	Hart
S. F. Middleton	Democratic	1912–1914	Hart
Henry B. Avery	Democratic	1914–1916	Hart
Will R. Lyon	Republican	1916–1918	Hart
Robert T. Smith	Republican	1918–1920	Hart
Benjamin F. Shields	Democratic	1920–1922	Bullitt and Spencer
Smith G. Thornberry	Democratic	1922–1924	Bullitt and Spencer
Felix W. Collings	Democratic	1924–1926	Bullitt and Spencer
John R. Buckman	Democratic	1926–1928	Bullitt and Spencer
Harry Cochran	Democratic	1928–1930	Bullitt and Spencer
John R. Buckman	Democratic	1930–1932	Bullitt and Spencer
Benjamin F. Shields	Democratic	1932–1934	Bullitt and Spencer
Harold L. Barnes	Democratic	1934–1936	Bullitt and Spencer
Benjamin F. Shields	Democratic	1936–1938	Bullitt and Spencer
C. P. Bradbury	Democratic	1938–1940	Bullitt and Spencer
Benjamin F. Shields	Democratic	1940–1942	Bullitt and Spencer
Bert R. Hall	Democratic	1942–1944	Bullitt and Spencer
Johnston Miller	Democratic	1944–1946	Bullitt and Spencer
Harold L. Barnes	Democratic	1946–1948	Bullitt and Spencer
Joe B. Veech	Democratic	1948–1950	Bullitt and Spencer
J. D. Buckman Jr.	Democratic	1950–1952	Bullitt and Spencer
Joe B. Veech	Democratic	1952–1954	Bullitt and Spencer
Leo A. Bleemel	Democratic	1954–1956	Bullitt and Spencer
D. C. Casey Jr.	Democratic	1956–1960	Bullitt and Spencer
J. D. Buckman Jr.	Democratic	1960–1962	Bullitt and Spencer
Leo A. Bleemel	Democratic	1962–1964	Bullitt and Spencer
Allen E. Russell	Republican	1964–1970	Jefferson (part)
Peter D. Conn	Democratic	1970–1974	Jefferson (part)
Bob Benson	Democratic	1974–1980	Jefferson (part)
Bob Heleringer	Republican	1980–2003	Jefferson (part)
Ronald E. Crimm	Republican	2003–2015	Jefferson (part)
Ronald E. Crimm	Republican	2015–2017	Jefferson and Oldham (parts)
Jason Nemes	Republican	2017–2023	Jefferson and Oldham (parts)
Jason Nemes	Republican	2023–2027	Jefferson, Oldham and Shelby (parts)
Jennifer Hardin	Democratic	2027–present	Jefferson, Oldham and Shelby (parts)
