= T. G. Henderson House =

Historic house in Florida, United States

- U.S. National Register of Historic Places
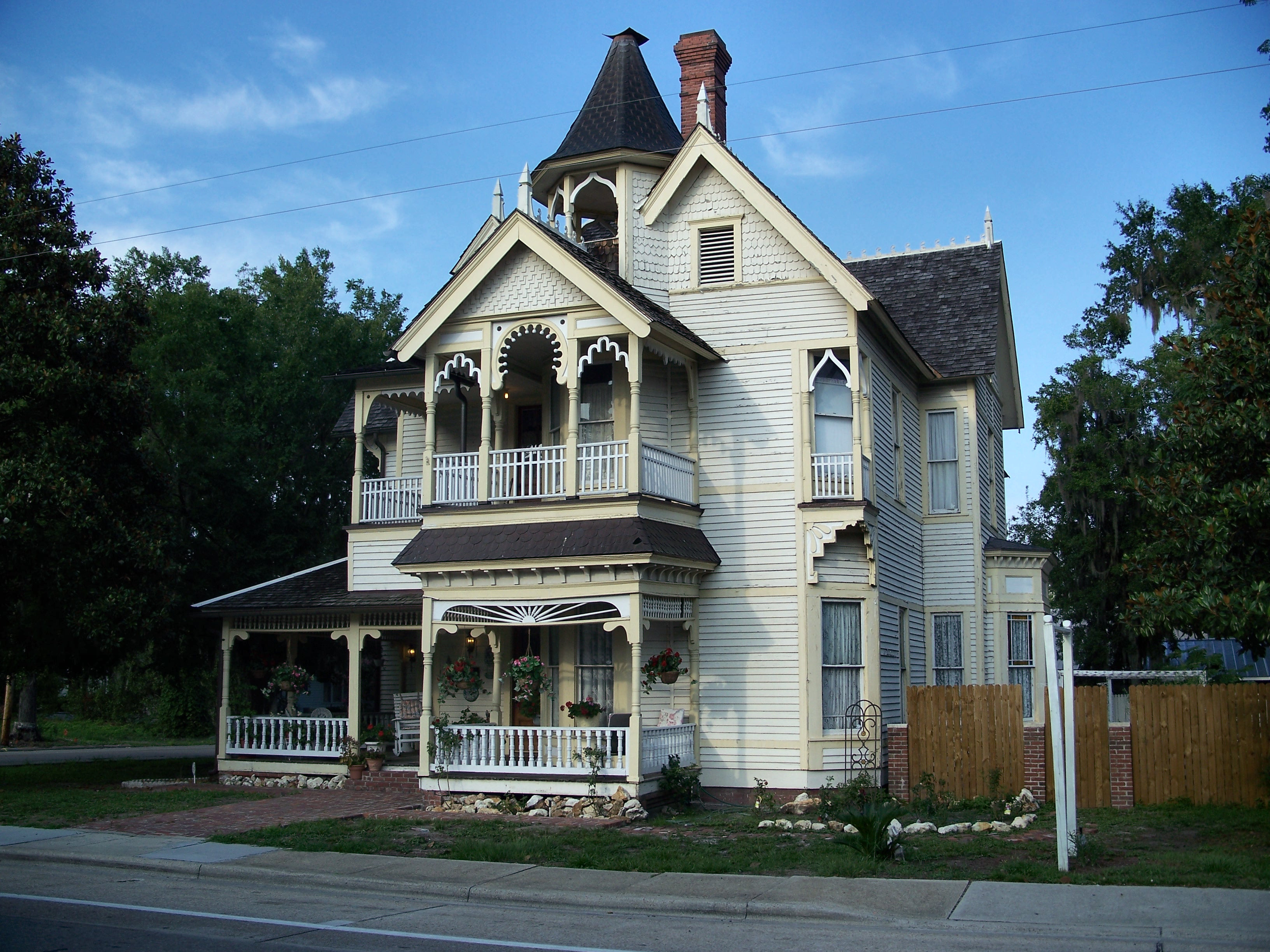

- Location within Florida
- Location: Lake City, Florida
- Coordinates: 30°11′15″N 82°38′14″W
- Built: 1894
- Architect: George W. Barber
- Architectural style: Queen Anne, Stick-Eastlake
- NRHP reference No.: 73000571
- Added to NRHP: July 24, 1973

The T. G. Henderson House (also known as the Henderson-Marcello House) is a historic house located at 207 South Marion Street in Lake City, Florida. It is locally significant as an excellent example of the later, more developed phase of the Eastlake style, the house has an abundance of exterior ornamentation and an attention to surface detail characteristic of the period just prior to the transition into Shingle Style.

== Description and history ==
The exterior fabric of the house is clapboard with corner boards on the principal corners. In addition, shingling was used beneath the balconies and in the gables, being laid in an imbricated pattern and in alternate rows laid with staggered butts. The turret, which grows out of the southernmost gable, is open on its four northern planes. The original plans called for cresting along the ridge of the westernmost roof section, but this has subsequently been removed. There are two chimneys located at the back of the hipped roof which serve all interior fireplaces. They are both brick and have corbelled courses forming a Gothic Revival cap. The roofs are hipped and gabled and there is currently a galvanized tin covering over it.

It was added to the National Register of Historic Places on July 24, 1973.
