= Henderson House (Little Rock, Arkansas) =

Historic house in Arkansas, United States

- U.S. National Register of Historic Places
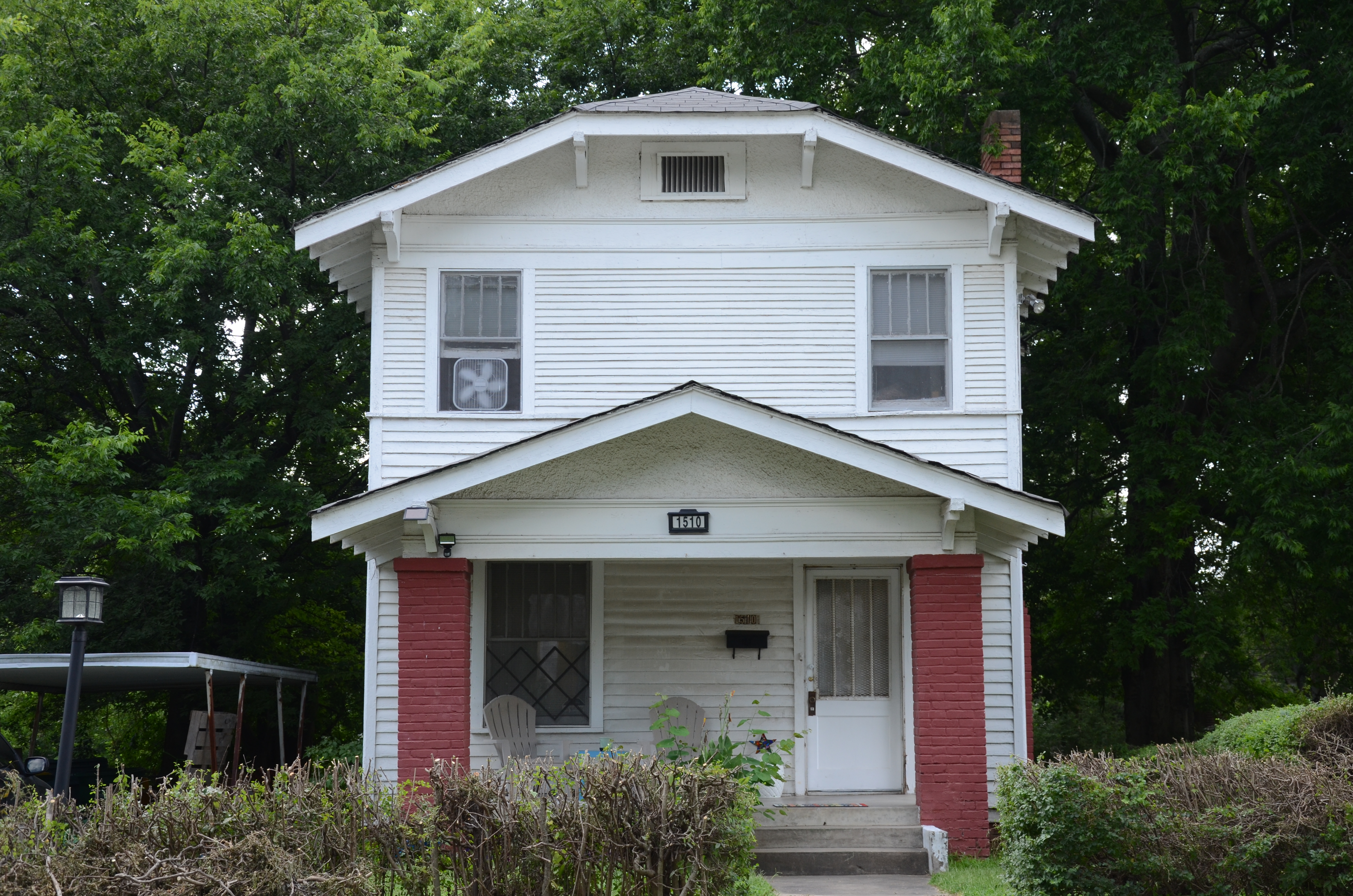

- Location within Arkansas Location within the United States
- Location: 1510 S. Ringo St., Little Rock, Arkansas
- Coordinates: 34°44′8″N 92°17′2″W
- Area: less than one acre
- Built: 1925
- Architectural style: Bungalow/craftsman
- MPS: Historically Black Properties in Little Rock's Dunbar School Neighborhood MPS
- NRHP reference No.: 99000548
- Added to NRHP: May 28, 1999

The Henderson House is a historic house at 1510 South Ringo Street in Little Rock, Arkansas. It is a two-story wood-frame structure with Craftsman styling, built in 1925 for Benjamin D. Henderson. Henderson was a prominent figure in Little Rock's African-American community, holding positions of importance in the Mosaic Templars of America, an African-American Masonic society. It is one of the finer houses in the Dunbar School neighborhood, a historically African-American area.

The house was listed on the National Register of Historic Places in 1999.

== See also ==
- National Register of Historic Places listings in Little Rock, Arkansas
