= Canton, Missouri =

- City
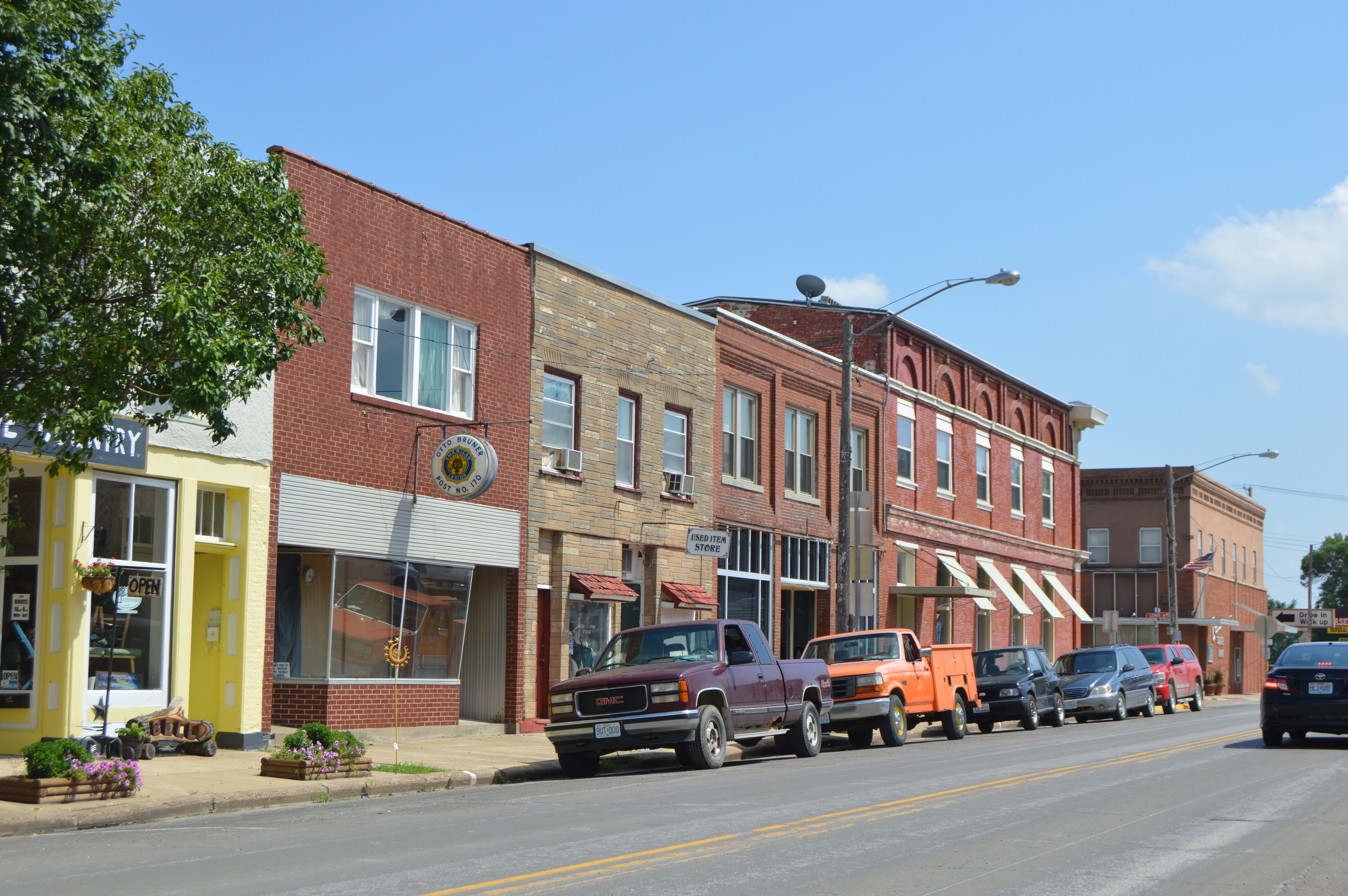
- Downtown on Fourth Street

- Location of Canton, Missouri
- Coordinates: 40°07′46″N 91°31′36″W
- Country: United States
- State: Missouri
- County: Lewis
- Established: 1830

Area
  - Total: 2.59 sq mi (6.70 km^{2})
  - Land: 2.29 sq mi (5.92 km^{2})
  - Water: 0.30 sq mi (0.78 km^{2})
- Elevation: 509 ft (155 m)

Population (2020)
  - Total: 2,774
  - Density: 1,214.1/sq mi (468.76/km^{2})
- Time zone: UTC-6 (Central (CST))
  - Summer (DST): UTC−5 (CDT)
- ZIP code: 63435
- Area code: 573
- FIPS code: 29-11134
- GNIS feature ID: 2393734
- Website: showmecanton.com

Canton is a city in Lewis County, Missouri, United States. The population was 2,774 at the 2020 census. Canton is the home of Culver–Stockton College, a small liberal arts college affiliated with the Christian Church (Disciples of Christ). It also had the oldest continuously operating ferry across the Mississippi River, which closed in April 2014. Four members of the United States House of Representatives have come from Canton, and are buried in the city's Forest Grove Cemetery. Canton is part of the Quincy, IL–MO Micropolitan Statistical Area.

== History ==
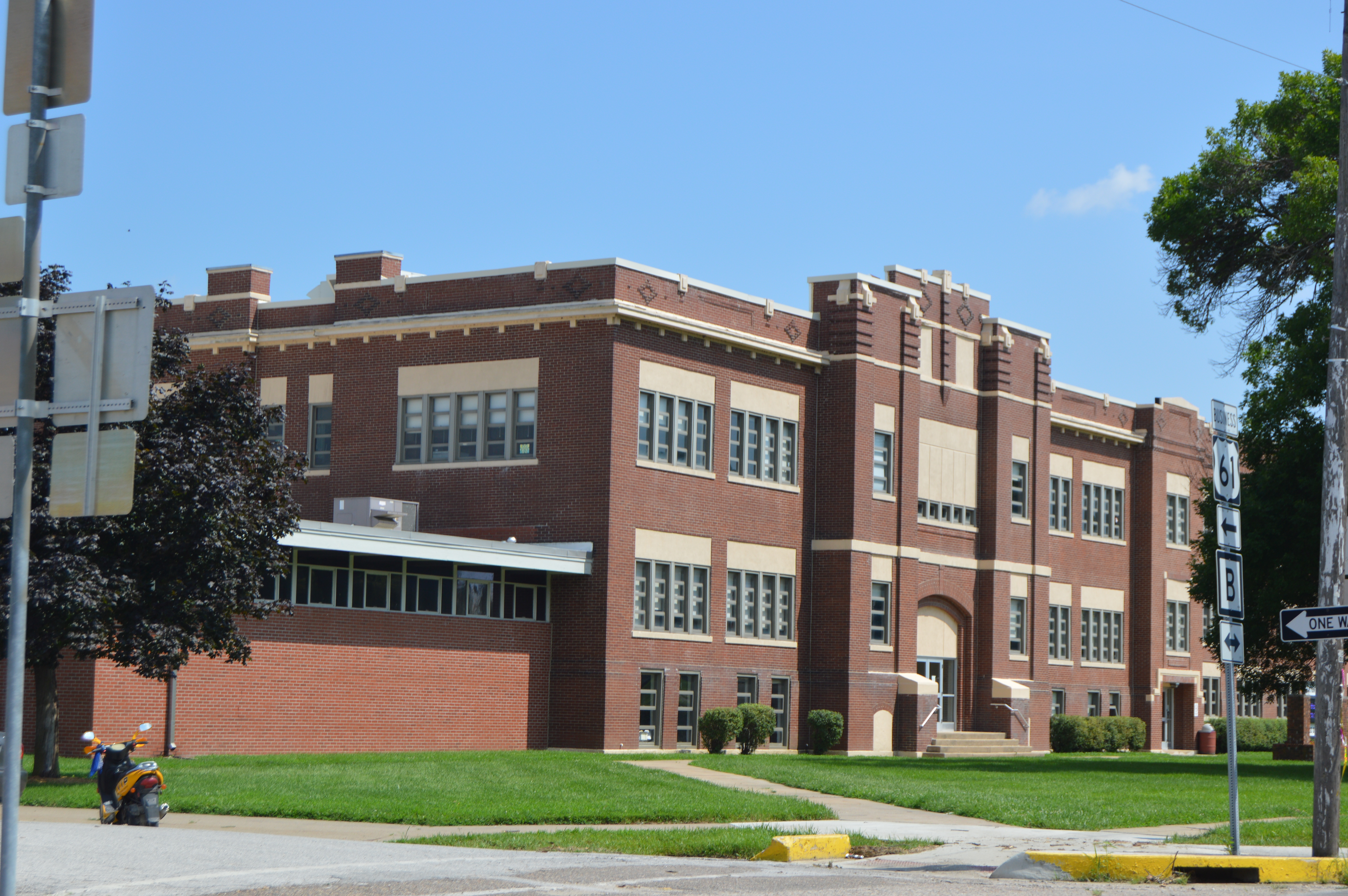
Canton High School

The city of Canton, believed to be named in honor of Canton, Ohio, predates the surrounding Lewis County by three years, having been founded in 1830, whereas the county would not be created from part of Marion county until 1833. It was founded by Issac Bland, Robert Sinclair, and Edward White—the latter constructing the town's first home in February, 1830. The building also doubled as Canton's first business, a tavern. Canton's early history could well be called a tale of two cities. The village of Tully, founded in November, 1834, was just a mile north of fledgling Canton and had a slightly better area for steamboats to anchor. Being the preferred spot to load and unload cargo, Tully slowed Canton's growth for the first two decades of its existence. However a series of floods, especially a major one in 1851, destroyed much of Tully. The few remnants of Tully were destroyed in the early 1930s during the construction of Lock and Dam No. 20.

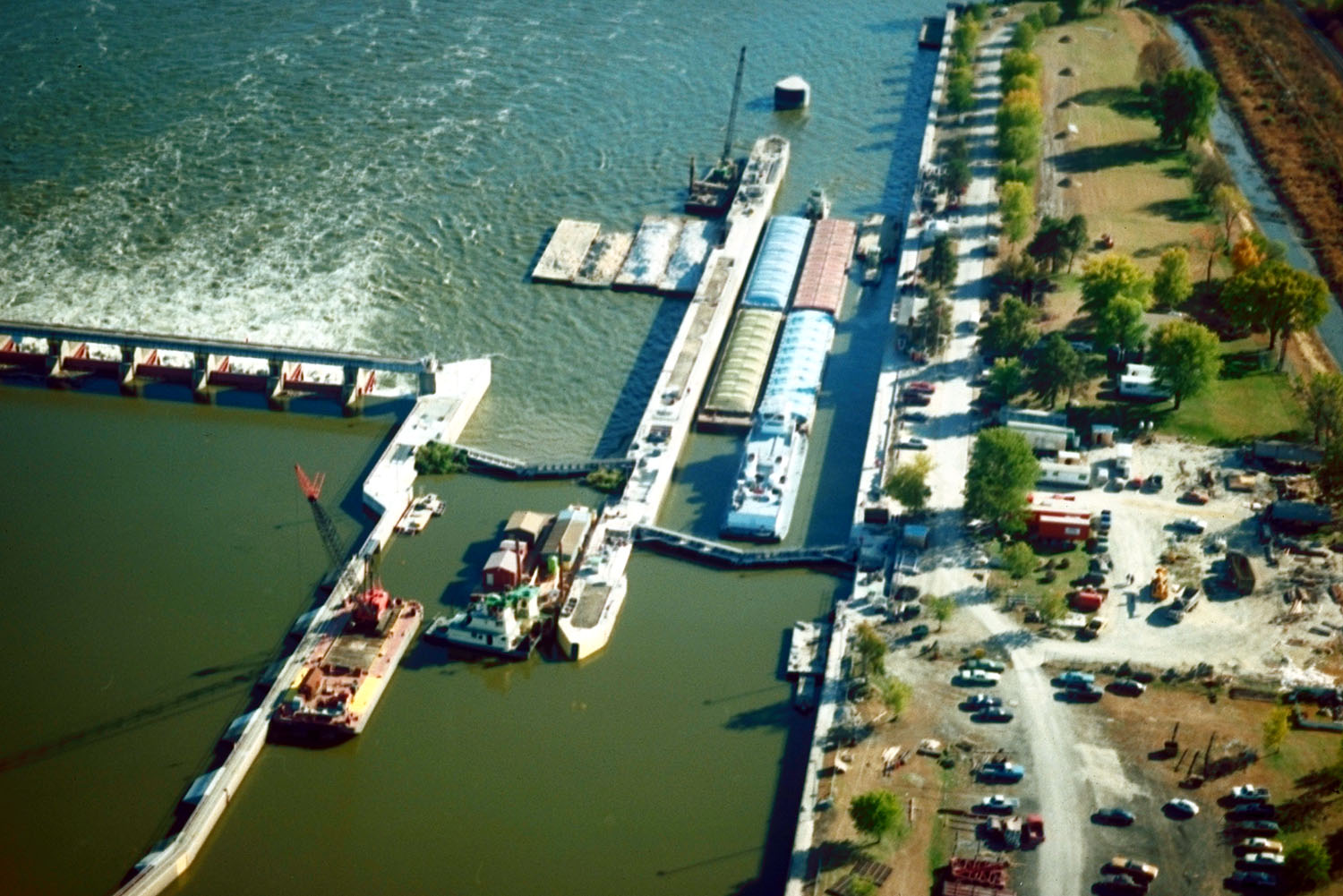
Lock & Dam No. 20, the former location of Tully.

Canton, with its somewhat higher ground but still close river proximity experienced rapid growth over the next nine years after Tully's demise and by 1860 had a population of over 2,000 people. The town was officially incorporated on January 28, 1851. Ferry service across the Mississippi River dates back as far as 1844 in the Canton area, the first being at Tully. On February 24, 1853 a charter was granted for the "Lewis-Adams" river ferry. The early ferries were paddlewheel craft with the power supplied by horses on treadmills. Local travelers and those heading westward in pursuit of a new life meant heavy use of the ferry, with early fares being 50 cents per wagon and 10 cents for travelers on foot. In an era where railroads were still few Canton, along with Alexandria, Missouri several miles upriver to the north, became major trading and shipping points for towns and counties on the northeast Missouri interior. A stage line ran from Canton as far west as Kirksville, some eighty miles away in Adair county, prior to the American Civil War.

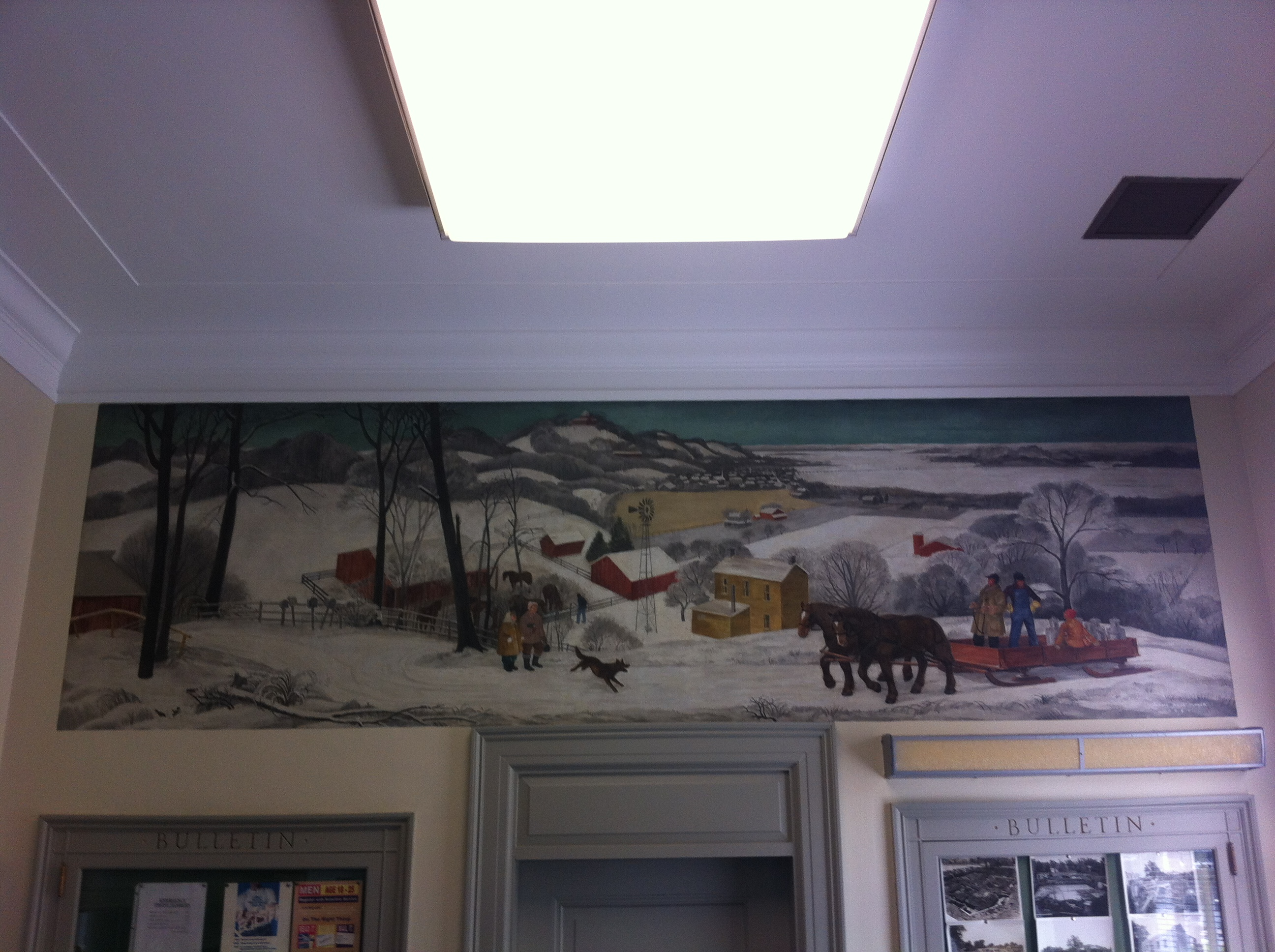
WPA mural in Canton, MO post office

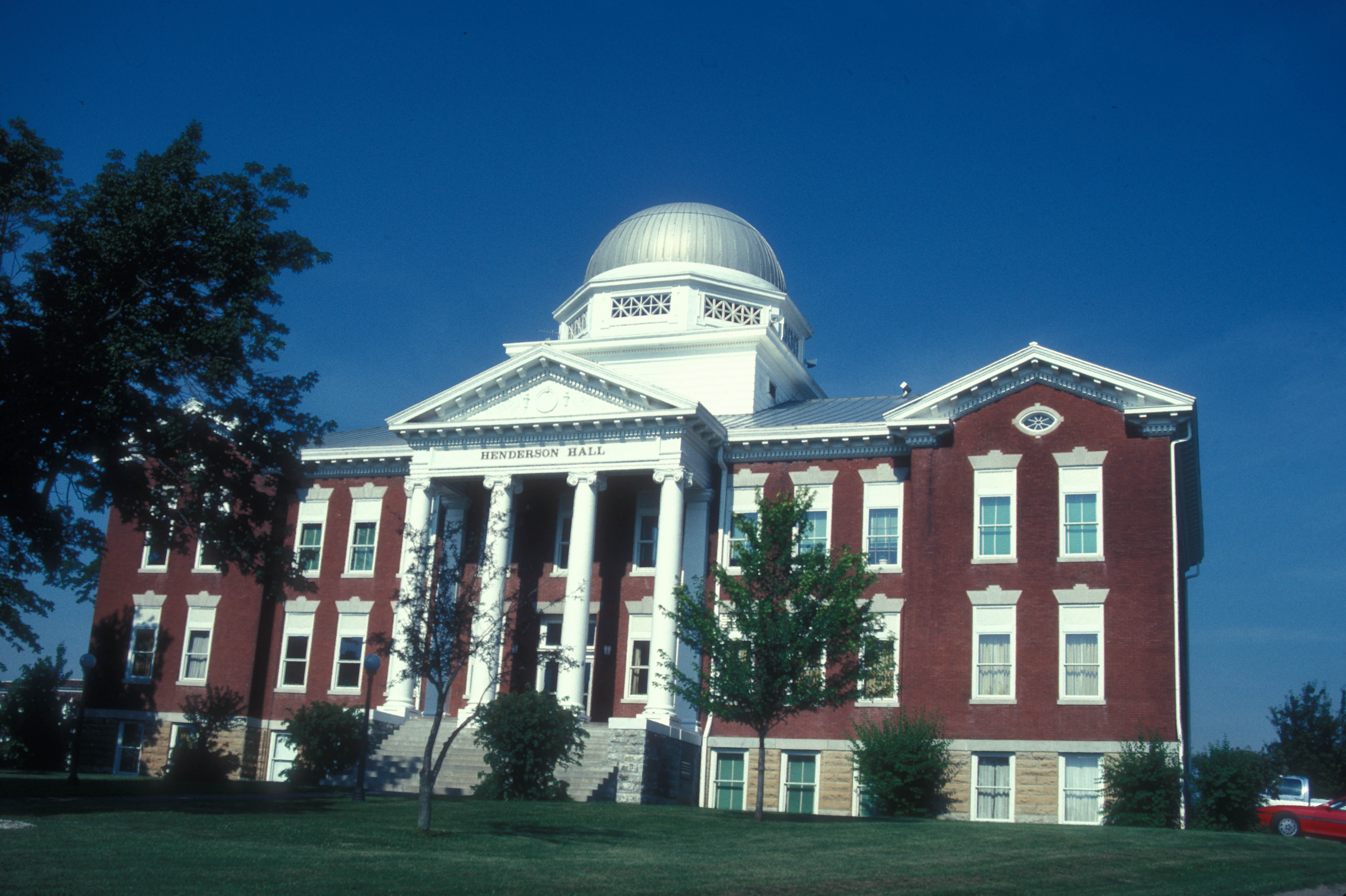
Henderson Hall looks out over Canton from atop "The Hill"

Another key event in Canton's history came about in 1853 with the founding of "Christian University", now known as Culver-Stockton College. Closed for a period of time during the Civil War, the college reopened in 1865 and has been a foundation of the community since. Henderson Hall, a.k.a. "Old Main", on the Culver-Stockton campus is listed on the National Register of Historic Places. As a strategic river port, Canton was involved considerably in the Civil War. Loyalties were heavily mixed and both the Union and Confederate armies recruited heavily in the town and surrounding area. Federal troops occupied Canton in July, 1861 to quell recent unrest and quash recruiting for the Missouri State Guard and pro-Confederate guerrillas by Lewis county residents Martin E. Green, Joseph C. Porter and others. On August 2, 1862 Colonel Porter ordered a raid on Canton. One resident was killed and another, a Union sympathizer, kidnapped by the bushwhackers, who also stole large quantities of weapons, medicine and other supplies.

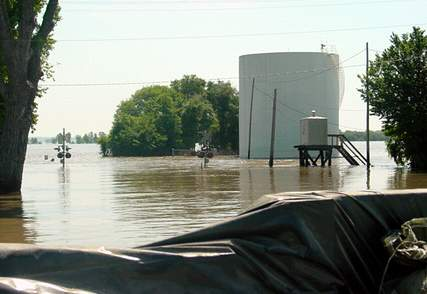
Flooding at Canton in June, 2008. The river crested at its second-highest level ever at Canton, 27.73 feet.

Canton continued its role as gateway to northeast Missouri agricultural after the war, with several industries catering to those needs. Pork processing had begun in the 1840s, with thousands of hogs being slaughtered by the late 1870s. Iron plows, wagons, a patented hand corn planter, and buttons—using mussel shells from the nearby river—were some of the diverse items manufactured in Canton in the 19th century. Limited rail service had existed in Canton in antebellum times but the tracks were destroyed during Civil War fighting. Rail service was finally restored to the town in 1871 with the arrival of the St. Louis, Keokuk & Northwestern Railroad. While the Mississippi river has been the lifeblood of the town, it has also been Canton's nemesis throughout the years. Major flooding has occurred many times in the town's history. Some of the more notable, in addition to the aforementioned 1851 flood, were in 1929, 1973, 1993 and 2008. The 1929 flood was caused by a levee break. Within an hour of the break two square miles of the town and surrounding countryside were underwater, including more than 200 homes and the Canton school building but there were no deaths. During the New Deal era, Jessie Hull Mayer won the federal commission to complete a mural in the Canton post office. Murals were produced from 1934 to 1943 in the United States through the Section of Painting and Sculpture, later called the Section of Fine Arts, of the Treasury Department. Mayer's mural, Winter Landscape was installed in 1940 and was restored in 1971, with additional restoration work performed in 2005.

Periodic flooding of the downtown area happened again after World War II, but was largely ended by construction of a bigger and stronger levee in the 1960s. Due to the new levee the Mississippi Flood of 1973, the Great Flood of 1993 and the June 2008 Midwest floods left Canton with far less damage than previous events and spared the town from the fates of other river towns. In June, 2013 a new "levee walk" and wetlands area was added to the Canton riverfront. The 2,000 foot trail provides both recreation and educational possibilities about the river and its habitat. Tornadoes have also been unkind to Canton. Several smaller ones have touched down in or very near the town in its history, with most doing little damage. However, a large tornado struck Canton on May 10, 2003 damaging an estimated 100 structures, 40 of them severely, but leaving only four persons injured. The Culver-Stockton College fieldhouse, which just hours earlier had contained a large crowd for spring commencement, was virtually destroyed while the dome on Henderson Hall was also ripped away. Henderson Hall is one of three locations in Canton listed on the National Register of Historic Places, the others being the Lock & Dam No 20 Historic District, and the Lincoln School building, a former school for African-American children in existence from 1880 to 1955.

In 2023, the Canton Police Department was put under investigation for a number of charges including corruption, stolen guns, missing drugs, stolen money, tampering with evidence, and officers driving drunk when on duty. Mass resignations as a result of the investigations left Canton without a police force in August 2023. During this investigation, Canton mayor, Jarrod Phillips, also resigned from his position.

As of April 2026, the Police Department is still unstable. On April 9, the only active police officer, Canton Police Chief Tycher Blakely, was placed on administrative leave. Since no officers were otherwise employed, the Lewis County Sheriff's Office, the La Grange Police Department, and the Missouri Highway Patrol started patrolling the city until more officers were hired.

== Geography ==
According to the United States Census Bureau, the city has a total area of 2.59 square miles (6.71 km^{2}), of which 2.29 square miles (5.93 km^{2}) is land and 0.30 square miles (0.78 km^{2}) is water.

=== Climate ===
Climate data for Canton, Missouri (1991–2020 normals, extremes 1937–present)
Month	Jan	Feb	Mar	Apr	May	Jun	Jul	Aug	Sep	Oct	Nov	Dec	Year
Record high °F (°C)	72 (22)	78 (26)	89 (32)	95 (35)	100 (38)	103 (39)	110 (43)	108 (42)	104 (40)	97 (36)	82 (28)	75 (24)	110 (43)
Mean daily maximum °F (°C)	33.5 (0.8)	38.4 (3.6)	50.4 (10.2)	62.6 (17.0)	72.0 (22.2)	81.0 (27.2)	84.8 (29.3)	83.4 (28.6)	77.2 (25.1)	65.1 (18.4)	51.0 (10.6)	38.7 (3.7)	61.5 (16.4)
Daily mean °F (°C)	25.3 (−3.7)	29.5 (−1.4)	40.4 (4.7)	52.0 (11.1)	62.5 (16.9)	71.9 (22.2)	75.5 (24.2)	73.8 (23.2)	66.4 (19.1)	54.5 (12.5)	41.6 (5.3)	30.7 (−0.7)	52.0 (11.1)
Mean daily minimum °F (°C)	17.0 (−8.3)	20.6 (−6.3)	30.5 (−0.8)	41.5 (5.3)	53.0 (11.7)	62.7 (17.1)	66.3 (19.1)	64.1 (17.8)	55.6 (13.1)	43.8 (6.6)	32.2 (0.1)	22.6 (−5.2)	42.5 (5.8)
Record low °F (°C)	−20 (−29)	−20 (−29)	−10 (−23)	14 (−10)	30 (−1)	42 (6)	49 (9)	43 (6)	27 (−3)	18 (−8)	−8 (−22)	−18 (−28)	−20 (−29)
Average precipitation inches (mm)	1.56 (40)	1.88 (48)	2.43 (62)	4.06 (103)	5.17 (131)	4.60 (117)	4.23 (107)	4.11 (104)	3.49 (89)	3.36 (85)	2.58 (66)	1.98 (50)	39.45 (1,002)
Average precipitation days (≥ 0.01 in)	6.9	7.4	8.9	11.1	12.0	9.8	8.6	8.2	6.7	8.1	7.9	7.1	102.7
Source: NOAA

== Demographics ==
Historical population
Census	Pop.	Note	%±
1860	1,496		—
1870	2,363		58.0%
1880	2,632		11.4%
1890	2,241		−14.9%
1900	2,365		5.5%
1910	2,218		−6.2%
1920	1,949		−12.1%
1930	2,044		4.9%
1940	2,125		4.0%
1950	2,490		17.2%
1960	2,562		2.9%
1970	2,680		4.6%
1980	2,435		−9.1%
1990	2,623		7.7%
2000	2,557		−2.5%
2010	2,377		−7.0%
2020	2,774		16.7%
U.S. Decennial Census

=== 2020 census ===
As of the 2020 census, Canton had a population of 2,774. The median age was 24.0 years. 17.6% of residents were under the age of 18 and 11.7% of residents were 65 years of age or older. For every 100 females there were 98.9 males, and for every 100 females age 18 and over there were 98.5 males age 18 and over.

0.0% of residents lived in urban areas, while 100.0% lived in rural areas.

There were 863 households in Canton, of which 29.1% had children under the age of 18 living in them. Of all households, 41.0% were married-couple households, 21.0% were households with a male householder and no spouse or partner present, and 30.5% were households with a female householder and no spouse or partner present. About 36.9% of all households were made up of individuals and 16.8% had someone living alone who was 65 years of age or older.

There were 978 housing units, of which 11.8% were vacant. The homeowner vacancy rate was 2.1% and the rental vacancy rate was 9.0%.

Racial composition as of the 2020 census
Race	Number	Percent
White	2,538	91.5%
Black or African American	60	2.2%
American Indian and Alaska Native	10	0.4%
Asian	17	0.6%
Native Hawaiian and Other Pacific Islander	0	0.0%
Some other race	28	1.0%
Two or more races	121	4.4%
Hispanic or Latino (of any race)	70	2.5%

=== 2010 census ===
As of the census of 2010, there were 2,377 people, 829 households, and 493 families residing in the city. The population density was 1,038.0 inhabitants per square mile (400.8/km^{2}). There were 954 housing units at an average density of 416.6 per square mile (160.9/km^{2}). The racial makeup of the city was 92.0% White, 5.3% African American, 0.2% Native American, 0.5% Asian, 0.2% Pacific Islander, 0.6% from other races, and 1.3% from two or more races. Hispanic or Latino of any race were 1.8% of the population.

There were 829 households, of which 29.9% had children under the age of 18 living with them, 43.5% were married couples living together, 11.1% had a female householder with no husband present, 4.8% had a male householder with no wife present, and 40.5% were non-families. 35.1% of all households were made up of individuals, and 14.8% had someone living alone who was 65 years of age or older. The average household size was 2.27 and the average family size was 2.93.

The median age in the city was 26.5 years. 19.1% of residents were under the age of 18; 28.9% were between the ages of 18 and 24; 19.4% were from 25 to 44; 19% were from 45 to 64; and 13.6% were 65 years of age or older. The gender makeup of the city was 48.1% male and 51.9% female.

=== 2000 census ===
As of the census of 2000, there were 2,557 people, 884 households, and 536 families residing in the city. The population density was 1,118.1 inhabitants per square mile (431.7/km^{2}). There were 1,011 housing units at an average density of 442.1 per square mile (170.7/km^{2}). The racial makeup of the city was 95.07% White, 2.11% African American, 0.27% Native American, 0.82% Asian, 0.55% from other races, and 1.17% from two or more races. Hispanic or Latino of any race were 0.90% of the population.

There were 884 households, out of which 31.2% had children under the age of 18 living with them, 45.7% were married couples living together, 12.4% had a female householder with no husband present, and 39.3% were non-families. 35.1% of all households were made up of individuals, and 17.3% had someone living alone who was 65 years of age or older. The average household size was 2.28 and the average family size was 2.96.

In the city the population was spread out, with 21.5% under the age of 18, 27.5% from 18 to 24, 21.4% from 25 to 44, 15.5% from 45 to 64, and 14.1% who were 65 years of age or older. The median age was 26 years. For every 100 females, there were 88.3 males. For every 100 females age 18 and over, there were 83.5 males.

The median income for a household in the city was $26,983, and the median income for a family was $34,444. Males had a median income of $26,573 versus $19,519 for females. The per capita income for the city was $14,663. About 10.5% of families and 16.8% of the population were below the poverty line, including 25.6% of those under age 18 and 11.5% of those age 65 or over.

== Education ==
It is in the Canton R-V School District. Canton R-V School District operates one elementary school and Canton High School.

The town has a lending library, the Canton Public Library.

== Transportation ==
Burlington Trailways provides intercity bus service to the city on a route between Cedar Rapids and St. Louis.

== Notable people ==
- James G. Blair, one-term congressman for Missouri's 8th congressional district
- James S. Green, congressman, U.S. senator, and diplomat
- Frederick Hibbard, noted sculptor of the late 19th and early 20th centuries
- James Tilghman Lloyd, ten-term congressman, House Minority Whip
- Frank C. Millspaugh, congressman, Missouri Commissioner of Finance
- David Moore, Union Army brigadier general and Missouri state senator
- Skip Williamson, underground artist
