= Henderson Hall (Canton, Missouri) =

- U.S. National Register of Historic Places
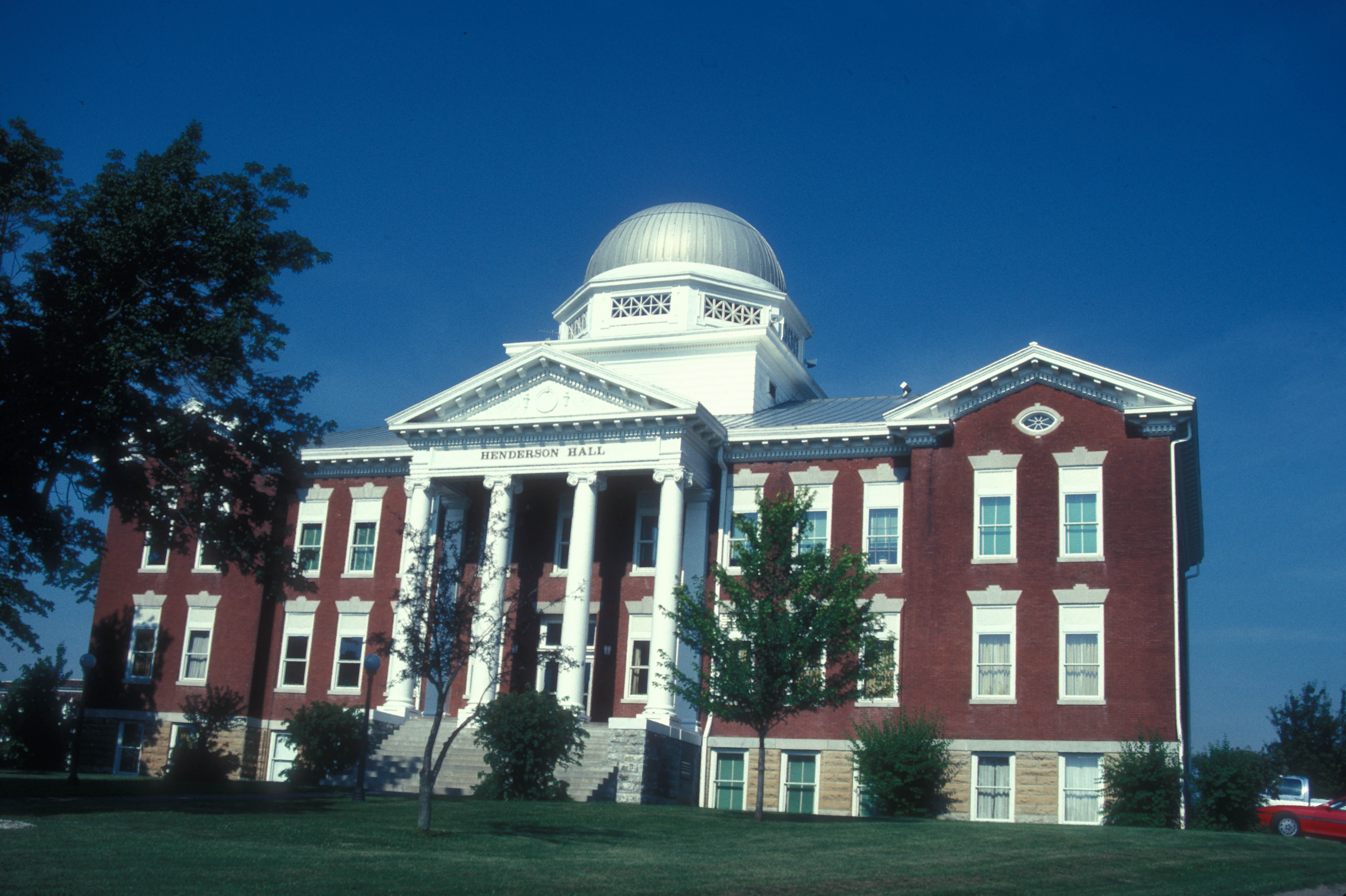

- Location within Missouri Location within the United States
- Location: MO B, Canton, Missouri
- Coordinates: 40°12′9″N 91°53′9″W
- Built: 1853
- Architect: Legg & Holloway
- NRHP reference No.: 78001666
- Added to NRHP: October 2, 1978

Henderson Hall is a building on the campus of Culver–Stockton College in Canton, Lewis County, Missouri. It is the oldest building on the campus, with elements dating back to 1853. At that time Culver-Stockton College was known as Christian University, the first co-educational institution of higher learning west of the Mississippi River. The building was named to honor D. Pat Henderson, one of the college founders. Henderson Hall was added to the National Register of Historic Places in 1978.

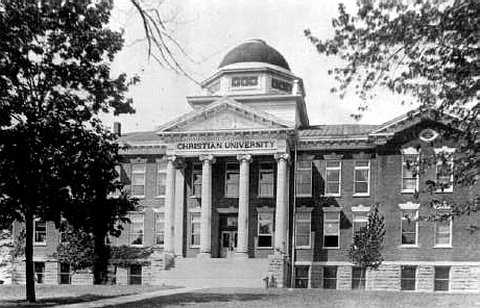
Henderson Hall, pre-1917 when Christian University became Culver–Stockton College. The original dome in this photo was replaced in 1960.

== Description ==
Henderson Hall is located atop a bluff approximately one mile from the Mississippi River. The building is a modified "T" shape 123 feet by 117 feet at its widest and includes a full basement. The Neo-Classical three-story building is constructed of red brick fronted by a large tetrastyle Ionic portico and topped by a large, distinctive dome visible from a considerable distance. The original dome was replaced in 1960, and replaced again in 2003 after a tornado struck the Culver-Stockton campus, damaging Henderson Hall among other buildings. The interior was significantly altered from its original construction during a major renovation in 1967-68, and has very little resemblance to its original look or design.

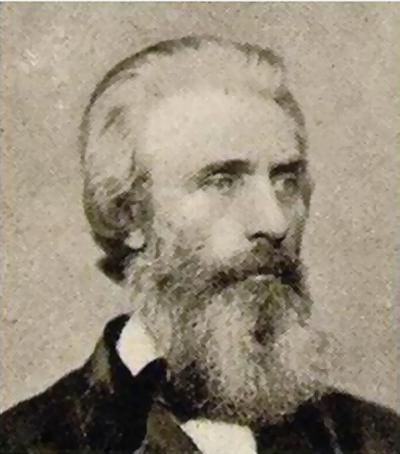
D. Pat. Henderson, for whom the building is named.

== History ==
On March 23, 1903 the original building on the Christian University (today's Culver–Stockton) campus, "Old Main", which predated the American Civil War, was destroyed by fire. Appreciating the importance of the college to the town, citizens rallied to its aid. In addition to opening up local churches and other buildings for use as temporary classrooms Canton residents raised $15,000 in just ten days to help the college rebuild. The college was able to salvage some stone and brick from the Old Main rubble, and using it plus the community's donation, an $8,000 insurance payout, and a $15,000 loan to build the current Henderson Hall.

Within a few short months the rubble had been cleared away and construction on the new Henderson Hall began on August 10, 1903. Knowing time was critical to the college and the town, construction workers labored through adverse Missouri winter weather to complete the basic building by the following spring. Even with using salvaged stone and brick from the original, the college still lacked funds to provide for amenities in the Henderson Hall when it was officially occupied on May 15, 1904. Further, the construction loan needed to be repaid so in August 1904 famed orator and political figure William Jennings Bryan spoke in Canton to help raise additional funds. The building at first housed men's and women's gymnasiums, a large assembly hall, dining room and various administrative offices. In 1915 the first of several remodeling projects was undertaken, adding science labs and a library. Further repairs and renovations took place in 1937, 1948, 1960, and 1968, changing both the purpose and interior look of the building. As mentioned earlier, in 2003 a tornado struck the Culver-Stockton campus, destroying the Henderson Hall dome, itself a 1960 replacement for the 1903-4 original. The dome was once again replaced and Henderson Hall continues today to serve as a campus centerpiece, housing primarily administrative offices but also some classroom space.
