= Samuel Hieatt House =

- U.S. National Register of Historic Places
- Location within Kentucky Location within the United States
- Location: Hieatt Road, Smithfield, Kentucky
- Coordinates: 38°25′03″N 85°15′28″W
- Built: 1850
- Architectural style: Greek Revival
- NRHP reference No.: 82001569
- Added to NRHP: October 29, 1982

The Samuel Hieatt House is a Greek Revival house built around 1850 approximately five miles north of Smithfield, Kentucky. It was listed on the National Register of Historic Places in 1982 due to its architectural significance as an outstanding example of Greek Revival style in Henry County.

== History ==
The house was built around 1850 by Samuel Hieatt, a prosperous local farmer. In the American Civil War, which started after the completion of the house, Hieatt took a neutral position and housed both sides at the farm.

== Architecture ==
The house is a rectangular two-story brick building. There is a portico with four Ionic order columns at the entrance.

The interior is unaltered, and is carried out in the Greek Revival style as well. The central hallway features a floating spiral staircase made of walnut. In the main block, all rooms have a square shape and are identical in size, with the sides being 20 feet (6.1 m) and the ceiling being 13 feet (4.0 m) high. The hallway, front room and dining room have the original faux marbling on the baseboards. Massive nine-foot doors estimated to weigh 600 pounds each separate the front room and dining room. Inset pilasters appear to support a raised pediment in the front room and dining room. The flooring was made with ash and poplar planks.

Other structures from the original farm include a cellar and a carriage house that no longer exists.
