= Smithfield, Kentucky =

City in Henry County, Kentucky, United States

- City
- Location of Smithfield in Henry County, Kentucky.
- Coordinates: 38°23′11″N 85°15′24″W
- Country: United States
- State: Kentucky
- County: Henry

Area
  - Total: 0.14 sq mi (0.35 km^{2})
  - Land: 0.14 sq mi (0.35 km^{2})
  - Water: 0 sq mi (0.00 km^{2})
- Elevation: 886 ft (270 m)

Population (2020)
  - Total: 124
  - Density: 910/sq mi (351.4/km^{2})
- Time zone: UTC-5 (Eastern (EST))
  - Summer (DST): UTC-4 (EDT)
- ZIP code: 40068
- Area code: 502
- FIPS code: 21-71364
- GNIS feature ID: 2405473

Smithfield is a home rule-class city in Henry County, Kentucky, United States. As of the 2020 census, Smithfield had a population of 124. The mayor of Smithfield is Greg Gephart.

== History ==
Smithfield was a station on the Louisville and Cincinnati Railroad. A post office has been in operation in Smithfield since 1851.

== Geography ==
Smithfield is located in southwestern Henry County. It is 7 miles (11 km) southwest of New Castle, the Henry County seat, 8 miles (13 km) southeast of La Grange, and 32 miles (51 km) northeast of Louisville.

According to the United States Census Bureau, Smithfield has a total area of 0.14 square miles (0.35 km^{2}), all land.

== Demographics ==
Historical population
Census	Pop.	Note	%±
1830	388		—
1880	183		—
1920	143		—
1930	136		−4.9%
1940	94		−30.9%
1950	121		28.7%
1960	60		−50.4%
1970	185		208.3%
1980	137		−25.9%
1990	115		−16.1%
2000	102		−11.3%
2010	106		3.9%
2020	124		17.0%
U.S. Decennial Census

As of the census of 2000, there were 102 people, 43 households, and 26 families residing in the city. The population density was 763.1 inhabitants per square mile (294.6/km^{2}). There were 47 housing units at an average density of 351.6 per square mile (135.8/km^{2}). The racial makeup of the city was 99.02% White and 0.98% Native American.

There were 43 households, out of which 30.2% had children under the age of 18 living with them, 51.2% were married couples living together, 4.7% had a female householder with no husband present, and 39.5% were non-families. 37.2% of all households were made up of individuals, and 14.0% had someone living alone who was 65 years of age or older. The average household size was 2.37 and the average family size was 3.19.

In the city, the population was spread out, with 28.4% under the age of 18, 8.8% from 18 to 24, 31.4% from 25 to 44, 23.5% from 45 to 64, and 7.8% who were 65 years of age or older. The median age was 29 years. For every 100 females, there were 121.7 males. For every 100 females age 18 and over, there were 114.7 males.

The median income for a household in the city was $26,250, and the median income for a family was $48,750. Males had a median income of $24,844 versus $30,417 for females. The per capita income for the city was $13,756. There were 10.0% of families and 18.7% of the population living below the poverty line, including 25.0% of under eighteens and none of those over 64.
