= Henry County, Kentucky =

County in Kentucky, United States

- County
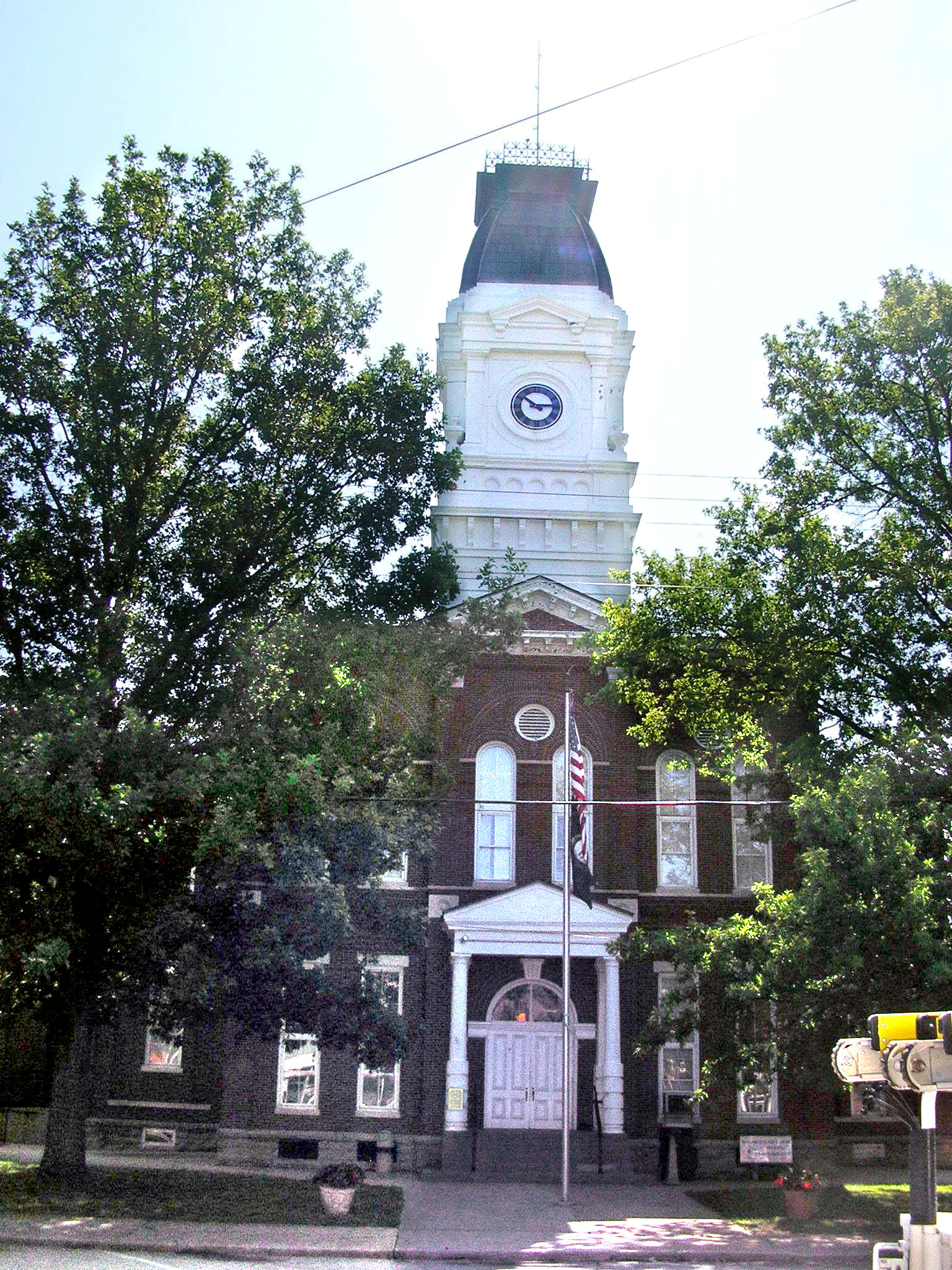
- Henry County courthouse in New Castle

- Location within the U.S. state of Kentucky
- Coordinates: 38°28′N 85°07′W
- Country: United States
- State: Kentucky
- Founded: 1798
- Named for: Patrick Henry
- Seat: New Castle
- Largest city: Eminence

Government
  - Judge/Executive: Scott Bates (R)

Area
  - Total: 291 sq mi (750 km^{2})
  - Land: 286 sq mi (740 km^{2})
  - Water: 4.8 sq mi (12 km^{2}) 1.7%

Population (2020)
  - Total: 15,678
  - Estimate (2025): 16,447 ▲
  - Density: 54.8/sq mi (21.2/km^{2})
- Time zone: UTC−5 (Eastern)
  - Summer (DST): UTC−4 (EDT)
- Congressional district: 4th
- Website: henrycounty.ky.gov

Henry County is a county located in the north central portion of the U.S. state of Kentucky bordering the Kentucky River. As of the 2020 census, the population was 15,678. Its county seat is New Castle, but its largest city is Eminence. The county was founded in 1798 from portions of Shelby County. It was named for the statesman and governor of Virginia Patrick Henry. Henry County is included in the Louisville metropolitan area. Since the 1990s, it has become an increasingly important exurb, especially as land prices have become higher in neighboring Oldham County. With regard to the sale of alcohol, it is classified as a wet county.

== Geography ==
According to the United States Census Bureau, the county has a total area of 291 square miles (750 km^{2}), of which 286 square miles (740 km^{2}) is land and 4.8 square miles (12 km^{2}) (1.7%) is water.

=== Adjacent counties ===
- Carroll County (north)
- Owen County (east)
- Franklin County (southeast)
- Shelby County (south)
- Oldham County (west)
- Trimble County (northwest)

== Demographics ==
Historical population
Census	Pop.	Note	%±
1800	3,258		—
1810	6,777		108.0%
1820	10,816		59.6%
1830	11,387		5.3%
1840	10,015		−12.0%
1850	11,442		14.2%
1860	11,949		4.4%
1870	11,066		−7.4%
1880	14,492		31.0%
1890	14,164		−2.3%
1900	14,620		3.2%
1910	13,716		−6.2%
1920	13,411		−2.2%
1930	12,564		−6.3%
1940	12,220		−2.7%
1950	11,394		−6.8%
1960	10,987		−3.6%
1970	10,910		−0.7%
1980	12,740		16.8%
1990	12,823		0.7%
2000	15,060		17.4%
2010	15,416		2.4%
2020	15,678		1.7%
2025 (est.)	16,447	▲	4.9%
U.S. Decennial Census; 1790-1960 1900-1990; 1990-2000 2010-2020

=== 2020 census ===
As of the 2020 census, the county had a population of 15,678. The median age was 42.0 years. 22.8% of residents were under the age of 18 and 18.8% of residents were 65 years of age or older. For every 100 females there were 98.2 males, and for every 100 females age 18 and over there were 96.0 males age 18 and over.

The racial makeup of the county was 90.7% White, 2.4% Black or African American, 0.4% American Indian and Alaska Native, 0.2% Asian, 0.0% Native Hawaiian and Pacific Islander, 1.7% from some other race, and 4.7% from two or more races. Hispanic or Latino residents of any race comprised 3.5% of the population.

0.0% of residents lived in urban areas, while 100.0% lived in rural areas.

There were 6,099 households in the county, of which 31.7% had children under the age of 18 living with them and 24.2% had a female householder with no spouse or partner present. About 25.3% of all households were made up of individuals and 11.9% had someone living alone who was 65 years of age or older.

There were 6,600 housing units, of which 7.6% were vacant. Among occupied housing units, 73.6% were owner-occupied and 26.4% were renter-occupied. The homeowner vacancy rate was 1.4% and the rental vacancy rate was 5.0%.

=== 2000 census ===
As of the census of 2000, there were 15,060 people, 5,844 households, and 4,330 families residing in the county. The population density was 52 per square mile (20/km^{2}). There were 6,381 housing units at an average density of 22 per square mile (8.5/km^{2}). The racial makeup of the county was 93.97% White, 3.30% Black or African American, 0.24% Native American, 0.35% Asian, 0.02% Pacific Islander, 1.26% from other races, and 0.86% from two or more races. 2.25% of the population were Hispanic or Latino of any race.

There were 5,844 households, out of which 33.80% had children under the age of 18 living with them, 58.70% were married couples living together, 10.40% had a female householder with no husband present, and 25.90% were non-families. 22.00% of all households were made up of individuals, and 9.90% had someone living alone who was 65 years of age or older. The average household size was 2.57 and the average family size was 2.97.

The age distribution was 25.40% under the age of 18, 7.90% from 18 to 24, 29.70% from 25 to 44, 24.70% from 45 to 64, and 12.30% who were 65 years of age or older. The median age was 37 years. For every 100 females, there were 99.30 males. For every 100 females age 18 and over, there were 95.90 males.

The median income for a household in the county was $37,263, and the median income for a family was $45,009. Males had a median income of $31,478 versus $21,982 for females. The per capita income for the county was $17,846. About 10.40% of families and 13.70% of the population were below the poverty line, including 15.50% of those under age 18 and 19.90% of those age 65 or over.

== Communities ==
=== Cities ===
- Campbellsburg
- Eminence
- New Castle (county seat)
- Pleasureville (partly in Shelby County)
- Smithfield

=== Unincorporated communities ===
- Bethlehem
- Defoe
- Franklinton
- Lockport
- Pendleton
- Port Royal
- Sligo
- Sulphur
- Turners Station

== Notable residents ==
- Wendell Berry, writer
- Reuben T. Durrett, lawyer, author, and Kentucky historian
- William J. Graves, U.S. congressman

== Politics ==
United States presidential election results for Henry County, Kentucky
Year	Republican		Democratic		Third party(ies)	
Year	No.	%	No.	%	No.	%
1912	805	22.52%	2,274	63.61%	496	13.87%
1916	1,302	33.17%	2,595	66.11%	28	0.71%
1920	2,208	32.01%	4,640	67.28%	49	0.71%
1924	1,918	33.86%	3,706	65.43%	40	0.71%
1928	2,334	44.29%	2,929	55.58%	7	0.13%
1932	1,643	27.44%	4,303	71.87%	41	0.68%
1936	1,516	29.93%	3,545	69.99%	4	0.08%
1940	1,445	27.12%	3,862	72.47%	22	0.41%
1944	1,497	29.57%	3,548	70.08%	18	0.36%
1948	1,193	25.44%	3,398	72.47%	98	2.09%
1952	1,584	31.29%	3,468	68.51%	10	0.20%
1956	1,670	34.52%	3,157	65.25%	11	0.23%
1960	1,714	36.60%	2,969	63.40%	0	0.00%
1964	838	19.21%	3,521	80.70%	4	0.09%
1968	1,271	32.04%	1,978	49.86%	718	18.10%
1972	1,919	52.49%	1,688	46.17%	49	1.34%
1976	1,192	28.25%	2,985	70.73%	43	1.02%
1980	1,723	35.82%	2,999	62.35%	88	1.83%
1984	2,802	54.83%	2,279	44.60%	29	0.57%
1988	2,286	46.98%	2,544	52.28%	36	0.74%
1992	1,640	31.42%	2,838	54.38%	741	14.20%
1996	2,110	42.12%	2,324	46.39%	576	11.50%
2000	3,244	59.27%	2,117	38.68%	112	2.05%
2004	4,094	62.99%	2,366	36.41%	39	0.60%
2008	4,081	58.98%	2,725	39.38%	113	1.63%
2012	3,940	59.79%	2,530	38.39%	120	1.82%
2016	4,944	69.16%	1,828	25.57%	377	5.27%
2020	5,843	72.05%	2,142	26.41%	125	1.54%
2024	6,093	75.46%	1,857	23.00%	124	1.54%

The county voted "No" on 2022 Kentucky Amendment 2, an anti-abortion ballot measure, by 53% to 47%, and backed Donald Trump with 72% of the vote to Joe Biden's 26% in the 2020 presidential election.

=== Elected officials ===
Elected officials as of January 3, 2025
U.S. House	Thomas Massie (R)	KY 4
Ky. Senate	Aaron Reed (R)	7
Ky. House	Felicia Rabourn (R)	47

== Education ==
School districts include:

- Henry County School District
- Eminence Independent School District

== See also ==
- Louisville-Jefferson County, KY-IN Metropolitan Statistical Area
- Louisville/Jefferson County–Elizabethtown–Bardstown, KY-IN Combined Statistical Area
- National Register of Historic Places listings in Henry County, Kentucky
