= New Castle, Kentucky =

- City
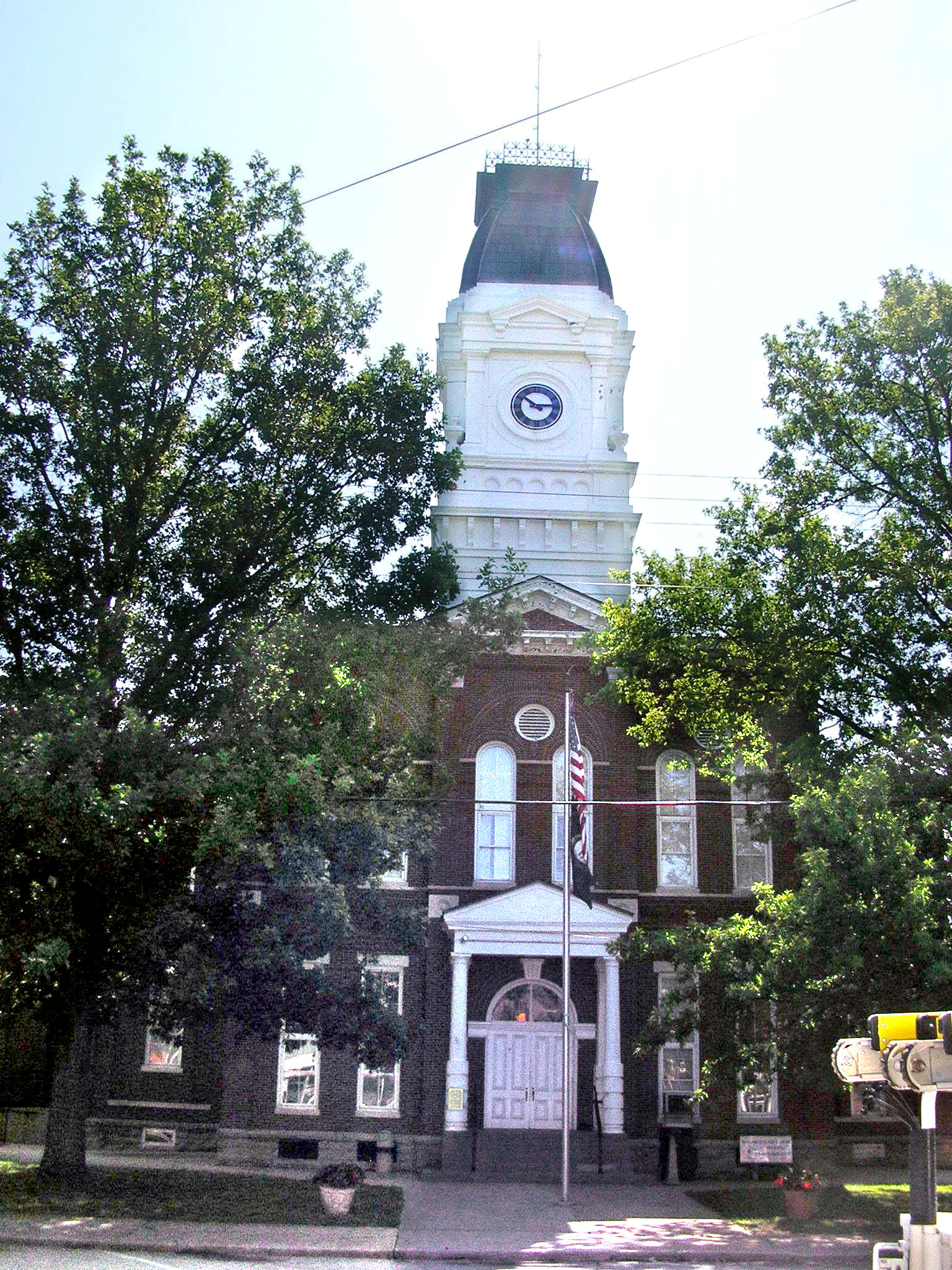
- Henry County courthouse in New Castle, Kentucky

- Location of New Castle in Henry County, Kentucky.
- Coordinates: 38°26′00″N 85°10′08″W
- Country: United States
- State: Kentucky
- County: Henry
- Established: 1817
- Incorporated: 1851

Government
  - Mayor: Phoebe Thompson

Area
  - Total: 0.41 sq mi (1.07 km^{2})
  - Land: 0.41 sq mi (1.06 km^{2})
  - Water: 0.0039 sq mi (0.01 km^{2})
- Elevation: 837 ft (255 m)

Population (2020)
  - Total: 884
  - Density: 2,157.3/sq mi (832.94/km^{2})
- Time zone: UTC-5 (Eastern (EST))
  - Summer (DST): UTC-4 (EDT)
- ZIP code: 40050
- Area code: 502
- FIPS code: 21-55596
- GNIS feature ID: 2404359
- Website: www.newcastleky.com

New Castle is a home rule-class city in Henry County, Kentucky, United States. It is the seat of its county. As of the 2020 census, New Castle had a population of 884. African Americans attended New Castle Colored School prior to integration.

== History ==
New Castle was incorporated in 1817.

The District Grand Lodge No. 19 of the Grand United Order of Odd Fellows, a fraternal organization of African Americans, was in New Castle. The group's Washington Lodge #1513 in New Castle was established in 1872 by former slaves. A historical marker by its building commemorates its history.

== Geography ==
New Castle is located southwest of the center of Henry County. U.S. Route 421 follows Main Street and leads north 7 miles (11 km) to Campbellsburg and southeast 29 miles (47 km) to Frankfort. Louisville is 38 miles (61 km) to the southwest via Kentucky Route 146 and Interstate 71.

According to the United States Census Bureau, New Castle has a total area of 0.42 square miles (1.1 km^{2}), of which 0.004 square miles (0.01 km^{2}), or 1.04%, is water.

== Demographics ==
Historical population
Census	Pop.	Note	%±
1830	538		—
1840	528		−1.9%
1860	519		—
1870	670		29.1%
1880	500		−25.4%
1890	485		−3.0%
1900	462		−4.7%
1910	468		1.3%
1920	397		−15.2%
1930	447		12.6%
1940	487		8.9%
1950	631		29.6%
1960	699		10.8%
1970	755		8.0%
1980	832		10.2%
1990	893		7.3%
2000	919		2.9%
2010	912		−0.8%
2020	884		−3.1%
U.S. Decennial Census

At the census of 2000, there were 919 people, 382 households, and 239 families residing in the city. The population density was 2,067.0 inhabitants per square mile (798.1/km^{2}). There were 409 housing units at an average density of 919.9 per square mile (355.2/km^{2}). The racial makeup of the city was 92.60% White, 5.77% Black or African American, 0.98% from other races, and 0.65% from two or more races. Hispanic or Latino of any race were 1.52% of the population.

There were 382 households, out of which 29.8% had children under the age of 18 living with them, 41.6% were married couples living together, 17.5% had a female householder with no husband present, and 37.2% were non-families. 33.2% of all households were made up of individuals, and 17.3% had someone living alone who was 65 years of age or older. The average household size was 2.25 and the average family size was 2.86.

In the city, the population was spread out, with 22.7% under the age of 18, 7.9% from 18 to 24, 25.2% from 25 to 44, 25.0% from 45 to 64, and 19.0% who were 65 years of age or older. The median age was 40 years. For every 100 females, there were 77.8 males. For every 100 females age 18 and over, there were 73.2 males.

The median income for a household in the city was $24,931, and the median income for a family was $34,550. Males had a median income of $27,813 versus $19,615 for females. The per capita income for the city was $12,626. About 26.8% of families and 27.3% of the population were below the poverty line, including 34.4% of those under age 18 and 20.9% of those age 65 or over.

== Culture and recreation ==
The Samuel Hieatt House, built in 1850, was listed on the National Register of Historic Places in 1982.
