= National Register of Historic Places listings in Lewis County, Missouri =

Location of Lewis County in Missouri

This is a list of the National Register of Historic Places listings in Lewis County, Missouri.

This is intended to be a complete list of the properties and districts on the National Register of Historic Places in Lewis County, Missouri, United States. Latitude and longitude coordinates are provided for many National Register properties and districts; these locations may be seen together in a map.

There are 12 properties and districts listed on the National Register in the county.

This National Park Service list is complete through NPS recent listings posted March 14, 2025.

== Current listings ==
	Name on the Register	Image	Date listed	Location	City or town	Description
1	First Presbyterian Church	First Presbyterian Church	August 28, 2012 (#12000562)	401 Jefferson; 40°02′38″N 91°30′05″W	La Grange	
2	William Gray House	William Gray House	June 3, 1999 (#99000666)	407 Washington; 40°02′35″N 91°30′07″W	La Grange	
3	Dr. J.A. Hay House	Dr. J.A. Hay House	June 3, 1999 (#99000664)	406 W. Monroe St. 40°02′44″N 91°30′06″W	La Grange	
4	Henderson Hall	Henderson Hall	October 2, 1978 (#78001666)	College Hill; 40°07′50″N 91°31′49″W	Canton	
5	Joseph Hipkins House		May 8, 2008 (#08000376)	500 S. 3rd St. 40°02′19″N 91°30′03″W	La Grange	
6	Lewis County Courthouse	Lewis County Courthouse	January 12, 2005 (#04001476)	100 E. Lafayette St. 40°07′05″N 91°42′51″W	Monticello	
7	Lincoln School	Lincoln School	February 10, 1983 (#83001029)	MO B 40°07′32″N 91°31′02″W	Canton	
8	Lock and Dam No. 20 Historic District	Lock and Dam No. 20 Historic District	March 10, 2004 (#04000180)	0.5 miles (0.80 km) north of Henderson St. 40°08′38″N 91°30′41″W	Canton	Extends into Adams County, Illinois
9	John McKoon House	John McKoon House	June 3, 1999 (#99000665)	500 W. Monroe St. 40°02′44″N 91°30′08″W	La Grange	
10	Quincy, Missouri, and Pacific Railroad Station		May 7, 1979 (#79001379)	Off MO 16; 40°05′11″N 91°48′26″W	Lewistown	
11	Fred Rhoda House		June 3, 1999 (#99000662)	200 S. Second St. 40°02′27″N 91°29′57″W	La Grange	
12	A.C. Waltman House	A.C. Waltman House	June 3, 1999 (#99000663)	302 Lewis St. 40°02′25″N 91°30′02″W	La Grange	

== See also ==
- List of National Historic Landmarks in Missouri
- National Register of Historic Places listings in Missouri
