= Hipkins =

Hipkins is an English surname. Notable people with the surname include:

- Alfred James Hipkins (1826–1903), English musician
- Chris Hipkins (born 1978), Prime Minister of New Zealand (2023)
- Edith Hipkins (1854–1945), English painter
- Gavin Hipkins (born 1968), New Zealander photographer
- Roland Hipkins (1894–1951), English artist

== See also ==
- Joe Hipkin, English cricketer
- Joseph Hipkins House, Missouri, United States
