= Midway, Lewis County, Missouri =

Unincorporated community in the US state of Missouri

Coordinates: 40°09′32″N 91°49′38″W

Midway is an unincorporated community in Reddish Township Lewis County, in the U.S. state of Missouri.

The community was named for its central location relative to Deer Ridge and Monticello.

It is located near the Fabius River, and as of 2012 holds a couple of houses, albeit the town itself is rather rural.
