= Tornado outbreak of April 8–9, 1999 =

April 1999 tornadoes in US

Meteorological history
- Duration: April 8–9, 1999

Tornado outbreak
- Tornadoes: 54 confirmed
- Max. rating: F4 tornado
- Duration: 30 hours

Overall effects
- Casualties: 6 fatalities, 100 injuries
- Damage: $82 million
- Areas affected: Midwest, South Carolina, Virginia
- Part of the Tornadoes of 1999

The tornado outbreak of April 8–9, 1999 was a widespread tornado outbreak that affected the United States in early April 1999. It is best known for producing an F4 that killed four people in the Blue Ash and Montgomery, Ohio, areas.

== Confirmed tornadoes ==
Confirmed tornadoes by Fujita rating
FU	F0	F1	F2	F3	F4	F5	Total
0	14	25	8	4	3	0	54

=== April 8 event ===
F#	Location	County	Time (UTC)	Path length	Damage
Nebraska
F1	NW of Aurora	Hamilton	1600	4 miles (6.4 km)	A grain dryer was destroyed while several center pivots and a few outbuildings were damaged.
F1	NE of Clarks	Merrick	1654	3 miles (4.8 km)	Five sheds were destroyed and several center pivots were damaged.
F0	S of Belgrade	Nance	1656	1 mile (1.6 km)	A chemical applicator, a barn, and fencing were damaged.
F0	N of St. Edward	Boone	1722	1 mile (1.6 km)	Caused heavy damage to barns and outbuildings.
F1	NW of Schuyler	Colfax	1806	4 miles (6.4 km)	Caused damage to ten farmsteads and a church.
F1	W of Morse Bluff	Saunders, Dodge	1807	1.5 miles (2.4 km)	10 buildings were damaged, including a business that was nearly destroyed. 14 homes were also damaged.
F0	W of Yutan	Saunders	1812	3.5 miles (5.6 km)	Caused damage to outbuildings, center pivots, and a grain bin.
F0	SW of Orum	Washington	1848	0.1 miles (0.16 km)	4 outbuildings were damaged.
Iowa
F1	SE of Slater	Story	1833	2 miles (3.2 km)	44 homes and businesses were damaged, including one destroyed.
F0	E of Hamburg	Fremont	1908	unknown	Brief touchdown with no damage.
F0	N of Honey Creek	Pottawattamie	1918	0.3 miles (0.48 km)	Brief touchdown with no damage.
F1	Shenandoah area	Page	1922	5 miles (8.0 km)	Minimal damage occurred.
F1	S of Clarinda	Page	1936	8 miles (13 km)	A workhorse was killed and several homes were damaged.
F1	Red Oak area	Montgomery	1938	8 miles (13 km)	Several metal buildings at a pig farm were destroyed, and an RV was overturned and tossed into a frame house, destroying it.
F1	NE of Clarinda	Page	1948	9 miles (14 km)	Minimal damage occurred.
F0	Villisca area	Montgomery	1954	5 miles (8.0 km)	Caused damage to trees and outbuildings.
F4	NW of Guss to SE of Casey	Taylor, Adams, Cass, Adair	1954	49 miles (79 km)	This was a mile-wide wedge tornado. Farmsteads were swept clean by the tornado and checks and papers were carried several dozen miles from their original locations. One horse was thrown by a tornado and sustained severe injuries. 2 people were injured by the storm and damage amounts were pegged a $1 million in both Adair and Adams Counties.
F4	SE of Creston to NW of Granger	Union, Madison, Dallas	2048	56 miles (90 km)	Damage amounts in Union County were pegged at $2 million, and at $350,000 in Madison County. One person was injured by the tornado. One car with its occupant was thrown 250 feet away by the tornado but was uninjured. Five coal cars were also knocked off a track
F0	Des Moines area	Polk	2200	0.2 miles (0.32 km)	One house and several trees were damaged west of downtown Des Moines.
F2	W of New Virginia to SE of Rising Sun	Warren, Polk	2213	32 miles (51 km)	Tornado traveled mostly through rural areas with minor property damage.
F3	SW of Norwood to Colfax	Lucas, Warren, Marion, Jasper	2218	39 miles (63 km)	Three homes and a business were damaged or destroyed. 5 people were injured, and damage was pegged at around $1 million in Jasper County.
F3	Bloomfield to NE of Eldon	Davis, Wapello	2315	16 miles (26 km)	64 homes and businesses in the Bloomfield area were damaged. A farmstead and outbuildings were also damaged or destroyed outside of town. In total, 178 homes and businesses were affected and 5 people were injured.
F0	NW of Batavia	Jefferson	2325	0.1 miles (0.16 km)	Brief touchdown with no damage.
F0	SW of Richland	Jefferson	2325	0.1 miles (0.16 km)	Brief touchdown with no damage.
Missouri
F1	SW of Pumpkin Center	Andrew, Nodaway	1930	13.5 miles (21.7 km)	6 homes were destroyed, and two mobile homes, barns, outbuildings, and a grain bin were damaged.
F2	W of Bosworth to W of Atlanta	Carroll, Chariton, Macon	2120	53.5 miles (86.1 km)	14 homes and 9 mobile homes were destroyed, and several outbuildings were either damaged or destroyed. Also, another 40 homes and five mobile homes were damaged. A total of 85 agricultural outbuildings were destroyed and another 37 were damaged.
F1	N of Wheeling	Livingston	2120	7 miles (11 km)	A machine shed, a pole barn, a grain bin, and a garage were destroyed.
F2	S of Atlanta to SW of Novelty	Macon, Knox	2225	17 miles (27 km)	5 homes, 4 barns, 2 grain bins, and 3 mobile homes were destroyed. Six other homes and several outbuildings being damaged – some of the outbuildings were destroyed.
F1	NE of Billingsville	Cooper	2230	4 miles (6.4 km)	A church was damaged and three tractor trailers overturned.
F2	N of Midway	Boone	2255	4 miles (6.4 km)	A mobile home, seven outbuildings, a farm, and two pieces of farm equipment were destroyed. Five homes were damaged as well.
F2	S of La Belle to W of Derrahs	Lewis	2305	16 miles (26 km)	A modular home, 3 regular homes, and several sheds, barns, and outbuildings were destroyed. Three homes were also damaged.
F2	S of Hallsville	Boone	2305	10 miles (16 km)	A few farm equipment storage buildings, one barn, five grain bins, and a garage were destroyed. 4 homes were damaged as well.
F1	N of Mexico	Audrain	2330	10 miles (16 km)	Damage to an industrial complex, including a factory which lost parts of its roof. Several sheet metal buildings were destroyed. A barn, two equipment buildings, and two grain bins were destroyed while a barn and two homes were damaged.
F1	S of Osage Bluff	Cole	2330	12 miles (19 km)	Two barns were destroyed and 28 homes were damaged.
F1	NE of Linn	Osage	0000	8 miles (13 km)	One mobile home was destroyed while 79 permanent homes and several businesses were damaged.
F0	S of High Prairie	Webster	0015	0.1 miles (0.16 km)	A shed was destroyed.
F2	Louisiana, Missouri, to NW of Florence, Illinois	Pike, Missouri, Pike, Illinois, Scott	0034	27.3 miles (43.9 km)	There was minor roof damage in Missouri. In Illinois, five barns and a grain bin were destroyed while other farm buildings, two grain bins, an equipment building, two houses, and a boat dock were damaged.
Illinois
F3	Hamilton, Illinois/ Warsaw, Illinois	Hancock	2335	7.5 miles (12.1 km)	176 structures, including homes and businesses were damaged or destroyed including two destroyed homes in Warsaw, with many businesses and neighborhoods destroyed in Hamilton. KHQA-TV and KOKX towers were destroyed. 4 people were injured.
F0	E of Disco to NE of Berwick	Hancock, Henderson, Warren	0035	20 miles (32 km)	A farm shed lost parts of its roof.
F1	W of Exeter	Scott	0110	4 miles (6.4 km)	One barn and three grain bins were destroyed, and several other barns were damaged. The roof of a trailer was also removed, and silos were damaged as well.
F1	W of Joy Prairie	Morgan	0127	9.5 miles (15.3 km)	Several outbuildings and a barn were destroyed, while several homes, a barn, an airplane hangar and a garage were damaged. A boat was thrown off a trailer into a pond a quarter-mile away.
F1	Ashland area	Morgan, Cass	0145	9.3 miles (15.0 km)	1 death – One home, two outbuildings, 17 trailers, a shed, a barn, a hog shelter, and a mobile home were destroyed. 17 houses, 20 trailers, a church, a laundromat, a city garage and brick buildings were also damaged.
F1	SW of Tallula	Sangamon, Menard	0153	9.3 miles (15.0 km)	
F1	SW of New Douglas	Madison	0318	1 mile (1.6 km)	3 farms, outbuildings, one home and a garage were damaged.
F1	N of Cisco	Piatt	0335	3.5 miles (5.6 km)	1 death – A mobile home and two garages were destroyed, killing 1 and injuring 3 others.
F0	N of Janesville	Cumberland, Coles	0432	0.3 miles (0.48 km)	Three homes were damaged, with a front porch and a swimming pool being destroyed.
Indiana
F3	E of Dupont to S of Olean	Jefferson, Jennings, Ripley	0756	18 miles (29 km)	Several homes and barns were damaged, including one severely in Jefferson County. In Jennings County, 4 barns were destroyed and two homes damaged. Two metal power line towers were toppled as well. In Ripley County, four mobile homes, one house, 21 barns, 17 outbuildings, and 5 pieces of farm equipment were destroyed, while 4 mobile homes, 28 houses, 20 barns, 15 outbuildings, 7 vehicles, and 4 pieces of farm equipment were damaged. 2 livestock were killed.
Sources: Tornado History Project Storm Data - April 8, 1999

=== April 9 event ===
F#	Location	County	Time (UTC)	Path length	Damage
Indiana
F0	NE of Wilmington	Dearborn	0844	1 mile (1.6 km)	A barn was destroyed, while a silo and four homes were damaged.
Ohio
F1	Addyston area (SW Cincinnati)	Hamilton	0855	0.8 miles (1.3 km)	One house was destroyed and the roof of a garage was removed.
F1	Tipp City area	Miami	0900	3.5 miles (5.6 km)	Several campers and RVs were destroyed, while homes and storage buildings were damaged.
F4	Montgomery/Blue Ash (NE Cincinnati) to NE of Loveland	Hamilton, Warren	0912	10 miles (16 km)	4 deaths – In Hamilton County, 91 homes and apartments and 37 businesses were destroyed. 674 homes and apartments and 44 businesses were damaged. Two fatalities occurred in a home, and two others occurred in vehicles that were thrown. Hundreds of trees were snapped and uprooted along the path. Width of the tornado was a quarter-mile wide. Several homes, garages and barns were damaged in Warren County.
F2	S of South Lebanon	Warren	0933	1.5 miles (2.4 km)	Two homes and a barn were damaged, including one structure that was twisted from its foundation.
F1	S of Middletown	Champaign	1000	0.5 miles (0.80 km)	Caused damage to houses and mobile homes.
Virginia
F1	N of Porter	Spotsylvania	2217	3.5 miles (5.6 km)	Several sheds were destroyed and homes were damaged.
Sources: Tornado History Project Storm Data - April 9, 1999

== See also ==
- List of North American tornadoes and tornado outbreaks
