= Lewis County Courthouse =

Lewis County Courthouse may refer to:

- Lewis County Courthouse (Missouri), Monticello, Missouri
- Lewis County Courthouse (Tennessee), Hohenwald, Tennessee
- Lewis County Courthouse, Weston, West Virginia
- Lewis County Courthouse (Washington), Chehalis, Washington, listed on the National Register of Historic Places
