= Leg Branch =

Stream in the American state of Missouri

Coordinates: 40.226433°N 91.664884°W

Leg Branch (also spelled Legg Branch) is a stream in Lewis County in the U.S. state of Missouri. It is a tributary of Derrahs Branch.

Leg Branch derives its name from Billy and J. L. Legg, pioneer settlers.

== See also ==
- List of rivers of Missouri
