= United States–Israel Strategic Partnership Act of 2014 =

Two bills introduced to the 113th United States Congress

United States-Israel Strategic Partnership Act of 2014
- Long title: To strengthen the strategic alliance between the United States and Israel, and for other purposes.
- Announced in: the 113th United States Congress
- Sponsored by: Rep. Ileana Ros-Lehtinen (R, FL-27)
- Number of co-sponsors: 1

Codification
- Acts affected: Department of Defense Appropriations Act, 2005; Energy Independence and Security Act of 2007; Foreign Assistance Act of 1961; Immigration and Nationality Act, United States-Israel Enhanced Security Cooperation Act of 2012
- U.S.C. sections affected: 22 U.S.C. § 8603, 22 U.S.C. § 2321h(b)(2)(A), 22 U.S.C. § 2191(etseq), 42 U.S.C. § 17337(c), 8 U.S.C. § 1187,
- Agencies affected: United States Congress, Executive Office of the President, United States Department of State, Overseas Private Investment Corporation, United States Department of Defense,

Legislative history
- Introduced in the House as H.R. 938 by Rep. Ileana Ros-Lehtinen (R, FL-27) on March 4, 2013; Committee consideration by United States House Committee on Foreign Affairs, United States House Committee on the Judiciary, United States House Committee on Science, Space and Technology

United States-Israel Strategic Partnership Act of 2014
- Long title: To enhance the strategic partnership between the United States and Israel.
- Announced in: the 113th United States Congress
- Sponsored by: Sen. Barbara Boxer (D-CA)
- Number of co-sponsors: 5

Codification
- Acts affected: Department of Defense Appropriations Act, 2005, Foreign Assistance Act of 1961, Immigration and Nationality Act, United States-Israel Enhanced Security Cooperation Act of 2012, United States-Israel Enhanced Security Cooperation Act
- U.S.C. sections affected: 22 U.S.C. § 2321h(b)(2)(A), 8 U.S.C. § 1187(c)(2), 22 U.S.C. § 8603,
- Agencies affected: United States Congress, Executive Office of the President, United States Department of Commerce, United States Department of State, Department of Homeland Security

Legislative history
- Introduced in the Senate as S. 462 by Sen. Barbara Boxer (D-CA) on March 5, 2013; Committee consideration by United States Senate Committee on Foreign Relations,

United States–Israel Strategic Partnership Act of 2014 (H.R. 938; S. 462) are almost identical bills introduced to the 113th United States Congress.

== Background ==
The United States and Israel do not have a formal treaty of alliance, as the US does with other nations, and it is under no obligation to come to Israel's defense. However, the US does refer to Israel and other nations without treaties as allies. The US has supported Israel with foreign aid, providing nearly $3 billion in grants annually to Israel since 1985; Israel is the largest cumulative recipient of US foreign aid since World War II.

Israel applied to join the US government's Visa Waiver Program in 2005. The program permits citizens of selected countries to enter the US for up to 90 days without having to apply for an entry visa. The Senate rejected the bid because not all Israeli citizens own a biometric passport, the entry visa rejection rate for Israelis exceeded 3%, and Israel insists on stricter security checks for Palestinian Americans than other American citizens.

Israeli officials state that US citizens are free to travel to Israel. However, many Americans with Muslim or Arab names have been turned away from Israel without explanation. The US State Department states that "U.S. citizens whom Israeli authorities suspect of being of Arab, Middle Eastern, or Muslim origin" may be denied "entry or exit without explanation."

== Provisions/Elements of the bill ==
This summary is based largely on the summary provided by the Congressional Research Service, a public domain source.

In both the House and Senate versions the bill declares that Israel is a major strategic partner of the United States. It amends the Israel Enhanced Security Cooperation Act of 2012 to extend authority to add to foreign-based defense stockpiles and transfer obsolete or surplus United States Department of Defense items to Israel. It authorizes the United States President to carry out US-Israel cooperative activities, including in the fields of energy, water, homeland security, cyber-security, agriculture, and alternative fuel technologies, as well as renewable energy or energy efficiency. It also urges the President to provide assistance for enhancement of rocket defense systems.

The House version states that it shall be US policy to include Israel in the visa waiver program when Israel satisfies such program's inclusion requirements. The Senate version specifies that satisfaction of the requirements regarding reciprocal travel privileges for U.S. citizens would be subject to security concerns.

== Procedural history ==
In the House of Representatives, Representative Ileana Ros-Lehtinen (R-FL) introduced the bill H.R.938 on March 4, 2013. It currently has 182 cosponsors and has been referred to the House Subcommittee on Immigration And Border Security.

In the Senate, Senator Barbara Boxer (D-CA) introduced the bill S.462 on March 5, 2013. It had 63 cosponsors and has been referred to the Committee on Foreign Relations. The Bill was read twice and did not reach the Senate floor.

== Public perception ==
The bills have been promoted by the American Israel Public Affairs Committee ("AIPAC"), including at its annual conference in March 2013. AIPAC says that the bill's designation of Israel as a major strategic ally would be beneficial to the United States, as the "Middle East [is] in turmoil." AIPAC says that it is therefore important for America to "strengthen our alliance with friendly and reliable states," with Israel being such a state.

The American Jewish Committee supports both versions of the bill as well. An assistant legislative director at the American Jewish Committee stated that Israel had a "relatively low visa refusal rate," despite heavy screening and security procedures. Responding to concerns about Israeli Arabs posing a security risk to the United States, the AJC said such concerns "were overblown."

Representative Brad Sherman argued that there exist at least five other countries with a visa refusal rate of over 3% which were allowed into the program, and these rates were higher than Israel's 5.4% refusal rate. He added that he believes that accepting Israel to the visa waiver program wouldn't cause discrimination, but rather end it, and criticized opponents of the bill as members of a campaign to delegitimize the state of Israel.

Lara Friedman of Americans for Peace Now wrote that the bill "takes the extraordinary step of seeking to change the current U.S. law to create a special and unique exception for Israel in U.S. immigration law." James Zogby, president of the Arab American Institute, has lobbied against the Senate language, and said passage of such a law would codify discriminatory treatment.

== See also ==
- Israel–United States relations
- Israel lobby in the United States
