= Fisher Branch (Reddish Branch tributary) =

Stream in the American state of Missouri

Coordinates: 40.127264°N 91.890726°W

Fisher Branch is a stream in Lewis County in the U.S. state of Missouri. It is a tributary of Reddish Branch.

Fisher Branch has the name of the original owner of the site.

== See also ==
- List of rivers of Missouri
