= Cole v. City of La Grange =

Cole v. La Grange
- Supreme Court of the United States

Submitted December 8, 1884 Decided January 5, 1885
- Full case name: Cole v. City of La Grange
- Citations: 113 U.S. 1 (more) 5 S. Ct. 416; 28 L. Ed. 896; 1885 U.S. LEXIS 1645

Holding
- The general grant of legislative power in a state constitution only enables the legislature to use eminent domain or taxation to take private property, without the owner's consent, for a public purpose.

Court membership
- Chief Justice Morrison Waite Associate Justices Samuel F. Miller · Stephen J. Field; Joseph P. Bradley · John M. Harlan; William B. Woods · Stanley Matthews; Horace Gray · Samuel Blatchford

Case opinion
- Majority: Gray, joined by unanimous

Cole v. City of La Grange, 113 U.S. 1 (1885), was a United States Supreme Court case in which the court held that the general grant of legislative power in a state constitution only enables the legislature to use eminent domain or taxation to take private property, without the owner's consent, for a public purpose.

== Background ==
The city of La Grange attempted to use eminent domain to condemn property for the benefit of La Grange Iron and Steel Company to expand that served no public benefit.

== Decision ==
The Court held that the Missouri legislature could not authorize La Grange to issue bonds to assist corporations in their private business.

== Citation in future cases ==
The case was cited in the dissenting opinion of Justice Thomas in Kelo v. City of New London, 545 U.S. 469 (2005).
