= Weber, Missouri =

Unincorporated community in Missouri, U.S.

Coordinates: 40°01′01″N 91°36′16″W

Weber is an unincorporated community in Lewis County, in the U.S. state of Missouri.

== History ==
A post office called Weber was established in 1882, and remained in operation until 1907. The community was named after William Weber, a local merchant.
