= Argola, Missouri =

Unincorporated community in Missouri, U.S.

Coordinates: 39°59′51″N 91°47′14″W

Argola is an unincorporated community in Lewis County, in the U.S. state of Missouri.

== History ==
A post office called Argola was established in 1879, and remained in operation until 1901. The community's name is a corruption of Ogolar, the surname of a pair of settlers.
