= Gilead, Missouri =

Unincorporated community in Missouri, U.S.

Coordinates: 40°01′10″N 91°40′54″W

Gilead is an unincorporated community in Lewis County, in the U.S. state of Missouri.

== History ==
A post office called Gilead was established in 1854, and remained in operation until 1905. The community was named after a nearby Missionary Baptist church of the same name.
