= Ten Mile, Lewis County, Missouri =

Unincorporated community in Missouri, U.S.

Coordinates: 40°04′39″N 91°38′36″W

Ten Mile is an unincorporated community in Lewis County, in the U.S. state of Missouri. It took its name from a nearby Baptist church of the same name.
