= Derrahs, Missouri =

Unincorporated community in Missouri, U.S.

Coordinates: 40°13′23″N 91°39′51″W

Derrahs is an unincorporated community in Lewis County, in the U.S. state of Missouri.

== History ==
A post office called Derrahs was established in 1890, and remained in operation until 1904. The community took its name from nearby Derrahs Branch.
