= Dr. J.A. Hay House =

Historic house in Missouri, United States

- U.S. National Register of Historic Places
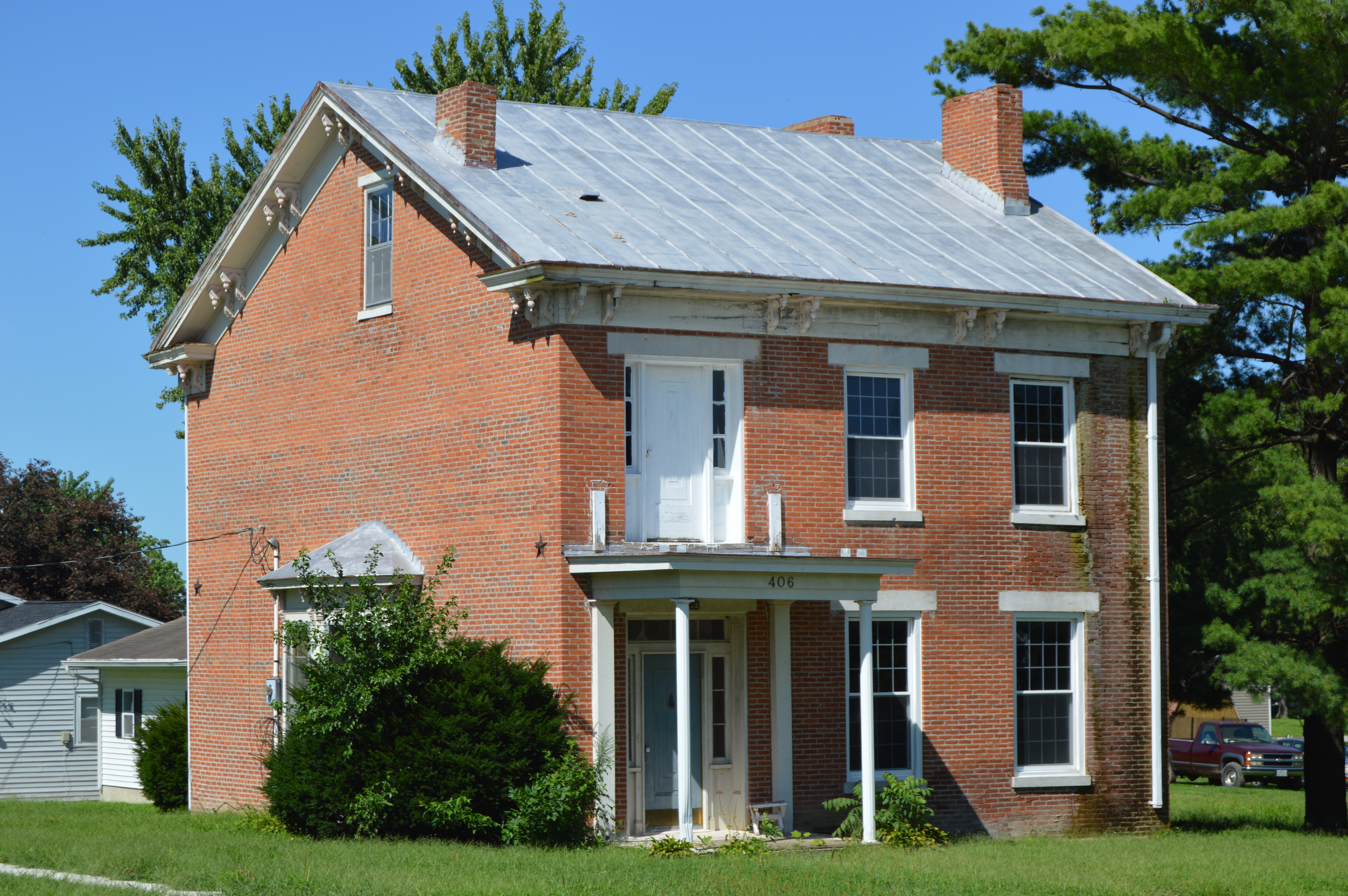
- Dr. J.A. Hay House, July 2015

- Location within Missouri Location within the United States
- Location: 406 W. Monroe St., La Grange, Missouri
- Coordinates: 40°2′43″N 91°30′6″W
- Area: less than one acre
- Built: 1854
- Architectural style: Greek Revival
- MPS: La Grange, Missouri MPS
- NRHP reference No.: 99000664
- Added to NRHP: June 3, 1999

Dr. J.A. Hay House, also known as Nelson House, is a historic home located at La Grange, Lewis County, Missouri. Built circa 1854, it is a 2 1/2-story, three-bay, massed plan, brick dwelling with Greek Revival style design elements. It also has a 1 1/2-story frame rear ell.

It was listed on the National Register of Historic Places in 1999.
