= Monticello, Missouri =

- Village
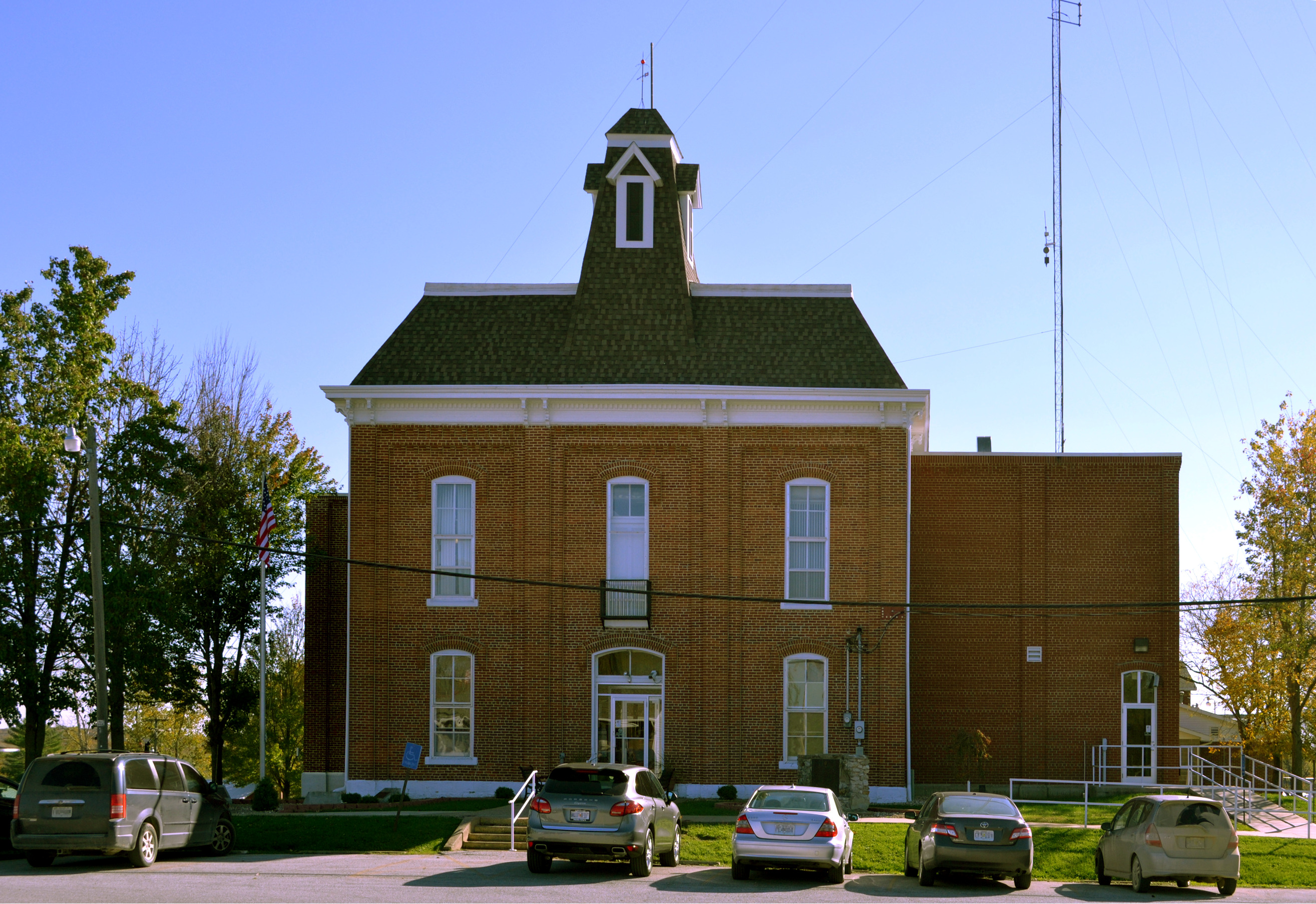
- Lewis County Courthouse, October 2014

- Location of Monticello, Missouri
- Coordinates: 40°07′08″N 91°42′47″W
- Country: United States
- State: Missouri
- County: Lewis
- Established: 1834

Area
  - Total: 0.26 sq mi (0.68 km^{2})
  - Land: 0.26 sq mi (0.68 km^{2})
  - Water: 0 sq mi (0.00 km^{2})
- Elevation: 650 ft (200 m)

Population (2020)
  - Total: 104
  - Density: 398.5/sq mi (153.88/km^{2})
- Time zone: UTC-6 (Central (CST))
  - Summer (DST): UTC-5 (CDT)
- ZIP code: 63457
- Area code: 573
- FIPS code: 29-49592
- GNIS feature ID: 2399389

Monticello is a rural village in, and county seat of, Lewis County, Missouri, United States, along the North Fabius River. The population was 104 at the 2020 census, and according to this census, Monticello is the county seat with the smallest population in the State of Missouri. The town is named in honor of President Thomas Jefferson's estate in Virginia. Monticello is part of the Quincy, IL–MO Micropolitan Statistical Area.

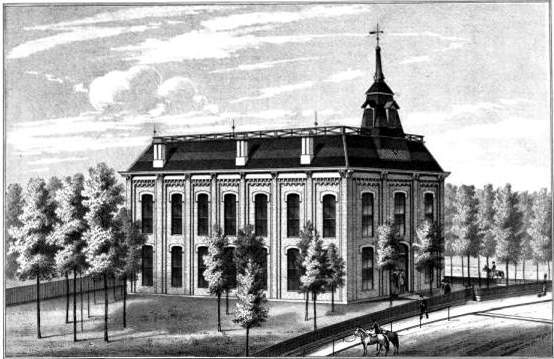
The Lewis County, Missouri courthouse in Monticello as it appeared in the mid-1870s.

== History ==
Following the establishment of Lewis County on January 2, 1833, two commissioners, Stephen Cleaver and Joshua Fensel, were tasked with finding a suitable location for the county seat. They passed on selecting already established villages like Tully and Canton along the Mississippi River and instead selected a location near the geographic center of the new county. An early settler, Andrew P. Williams, donated sixty acres of land and the town was laid out in the fall of 1833. However it would not be surveyed until the next year.

The county court appointed Judge J.A. Richardson the task of selecting lots upon which to build the courthouse, county jail, a schoolhouse, and church. The streets of the new county seat were also to be named, with those running north to south being Decatur, Jackson, Perry, Washington, and Water, while the east-west cross streets were christened Benton Clay, Greene, Jefferson, and Lafayette. The first houses were built in the town by William Graves, James H. McBride, and William P. Richardson very soon after the town was laid out. A hotel owned by William Ellis would follow. The first Lewis County courthouse in Monticello was a single-story primitive log structure which stood about 100 yards from the current courthouse site. Completed by June 1834, it was used only until a more substantial two-story brick courthouse could be built in 1839. Despite the North Fabius being navigable only by rafts, flatboats, and assorted small craft Monticello at first did a thriving business as a supply point for central and western Lewis County, as well as portions of neighboring Knox and Scotland counties.

The Lewis County Courthouse was listed on the National Register of Historic Places in 2005.

=== The Civil War ===
The Monticello area, like much of Lewis County, was pro-Confederate during the American Civil War. Perhaps the town's most significant contribution to the Southern cause was one of its most notable citizens, Martin E. Green. He and his brother, U.S. Senator James S. Green had come to Lewis County from Virginia in the mid-1830s. While James became a lawyer and politician, Martin operated a successful sawmill near Monticello. He would also enter politics, becoming a judge of the Lewis County court. With the outbreak of the Civil War and a riot at Canton on July 4, 1861, Judge Green called on Lewis County's pro-Confederate citizens to assemble under the banner of the Missouri State Guard at a training camp on the Fabius River at "Horseshoe Bend" not far from Monticello. A few weeks later Green's forces would be defeated by pro-Union Missouri Home Guards at the Battle of Athens in neighboring Clark county. Green and his band of northeast Missouri cavalrymen would go on to fight at Lexington, Missouri, Battle of Pea Ridge (Arkansas), and elsewhere in the trans-Mississippi theater. Green would rise to the rank of Confederate Brigadier General before being killed at the Siege of Vicksburg in late June 1863. Meanwhile, other units of Confederate bushwhackers and pro-Union forces would continue to clash in the county. On July 9, 1862, Confederate guerrilla leader Raphael Smith, a pre-war tanner in the area, raided Monticello with a force of eighty men. There they captured or "liberated" various supplies and forced one the towns ardent Union supporters to take an oath of allegiance to the Confederacy. Smith's group would again attempt to raid Monticello a few weeks later on September 1, but were driven off by the approach of a 300-man Union cavalry patrol.

=== Post-bellum ===
Times were difficult for Monticello in the years following the Civil War. Two railroads built through the county, in 1871 and 1872 respectively, bypassed Monticello for reasons that still remain unclear considering its status as county seat. Rail lines fostered better trade and allowed for towns such as Durham, Ewing, La Belle, and Lewistown to thrive and outgrow Monticello. In 1875, the need for a new county courthouse gave rival towns the chance to try and steal the county seat designation away from Monticello. In both newspaper articles and public meetings, residents of Canton, La Grange, and Lewistown all attempted to sway the county government. Lewistown citizens pledged up to $25,000 to build a new courthouse at no cost to the county, while La Grange offered to match or better that offer. Canton meanwhile, the county's biggest and most prosperous city, topped both with a pledge of $40,000 to establish the county government there. However, the efforts of all three towns were in vain and no real challenge to Monticello as the county seat would happen again despite its dwindling population.

By 1878, the Monticello business district included the following: The Lindell Hotel at the corner of Perry and Lafayette streets, the Monticello Savings Bank and United States Post Office on Lafayette across from the courthouse, the Southern Hotel, the Monticello House (a boarding/hostel house), the schoolhouse, two churches, a weekly newspaper, the Monticello Journal and the Monticello Seminary. The latter was established by the Methodist Episcopal Church in 1872 but closed by 1887. The population of Monticello was estimated at 350 by the late 1890s.

The town's development and population remained mostly stable through much of the 20th century; however, the farm crisis of the 1980s and the lure of better opportunities for the community's young in larger cities led to a steep decline in the last two decades of the century. By the 2000 United States Census, the population was only 126 residents. There are still a handful of businesses operating in Monticello owing to its county seat designation. Notable among them are a bank and the Missouri Department of Revenue license bureau. Children in the Monticello area now attend school at Lewis County C-1, a.k.a. Highland school district, near Ewing.

== Geography ==
Monticello is located at 40°7′4″N 91°42′51″W (40.117841, -91.714152). According to the United States Census Bureau, the village has a total area of 0.26 square miles (0.67 km^{2}), all land.

== Demographics ==
Historical population
Census	Pop.	Note	%±
1870	301		—
1880	324		7.6%
1890	350		8.0%
1900	287		−18.0%
1910	283		−1.4%
1920	244		−13.8%
1930	202		−17.2%
1940	198		−2.0%
1950	154		−22.2%
1960	159		3.2%
1970	157		−1.3%
1980	134		−14.6%
1990	106		−20.9%
2000	126		18.9%
2010	98		−22.2%
2020	104		6.1%
U.S. Decennial Census

=== 2010 census ===
As of the census of 2010, there were 98 people, 42 households, and 24 families residing in the village. The population density was 376.9 inhabitants per square mile (145.5/km^{2}). There were 49 housing units at an average density of 188.5 per square mile (72.8/km^{2}). The racial makeup of the village was 94.9% White, 1.0% African American, 3.1% Native American, and 1.0% from two or more races. Hispanic or Latino of any race were 3.1% of the population.

There were 42 households, of which 31.0% had children under the age of 18 living with them, 42.9% were married couples living together, 9.5% had a female householder with no husband present, 4.8% had a male householder with no wife present, and 42.9% were non-families. 40.5% of all households were made up of individuals, and 16.7% had someone living alone who was 65 years of age or older. The average household size was 2.14 and the average family size was 2.79.

The median age in the village was 43 years. 19.4% of residents were under the age of 18; 9% were between the ages of 18 and 24; 28.6% were from 25 to 44; 29.6% were from 45 to 64; and 13.3% were 65 years of age or older. The gender makeup of the village was 50.0% male and 50.0% female.

=== 2000 census ===
As of the census of 2000, there were 126 people, 51 households, and 31 families residing in the village. The population density was 481.5 inhabitants per square mile (185.9/km^{2}). There were 58 housing units at an average density of 221.6 per square mile (85.6/km^{2}). The racial makeup of the village was 98.41% White, 0.79% African American and 0.79% Native American.

There were 51 households, out of which 29.4% had children under the age of 18 living with them, 52.9% were married couples living together, 9.8% had a female householder with no husband present, and 37.3% were non-families. 37.3% of all households were made up of individuals, and 15.7% had someone living alone who was 65 years of age or older. The average household size was 2.29 and the average family size was 3.00.

In the village, the population was spread out, with 23.0% under the age of 18, 10.3% from 18 to 24, 29.4% from 25 to 44, 22.2% from 45 to 64, and 15.1% who were 65 years of age or older. The median age was 38 years. For every 100 females, there were 113.6 males. For every 100 females age 18 and over, there were 125.6 males.

The median income for a household in the village was $25,625, and the median income for a family was $26,875. Males had a median income of $28,750 versus $17,500 for females. The per capita income for the village was $16,592. There were 13.8% of families and 11.8% of the population living below the poverty line, including 23.5% of under eighteens and none of those over 64.

== Transportation ==
While there is no fixed-route transit service in Monticello, intercity bus service is provided by Burlington Trailways in nearby Canton.

== Education ==
It is in the Lewis County C-1 School District.

== Notable people ==
- Edward McKendree Bounds, author, attorney and prominent minister of the Methodist Episcopal Church South
- James S. Green, congressman and senator from Missouri
- Martin E. Green, Lewis County judge and later Confederate brigadier general during the American Civil War
- Robert Earl Hughes, Entertainer and sideshow performer, known to be the heaviest human being recorded
