= Lewistown station (Missouri) =

Lewistown

General information
- Location: Route 6 east of 177th Avenue, Lewistown, Missouri 63452
- System: Former Burlington Route passenger station
- Platforms: 1

History
- Opened: 1871

Services
| Preceding station | Burlington Route | Following station |
|---|---|---|
| LaBelle toward Kansas City | Kansas City – Quincy | Tolona toward Quincy |
- Quincy, Missouri, and Pacific Railroad Station
- U.S. National Register of Historic Places
- Location within Missouri Location within the United States
- Location: Off MO 16, Lewistown, Missouri
- Coordinates: 40°5′11″N 91°48′26″W
- Area: 0.5 acres (0.20 ha)
- Built: 1871
- NRHP reference No.: 79001379
- Added to NRHP: May 7, 1979
Location

Lewistown station, also known as Burlington Northern Railroad Station at Lewistown and Lewiston Depot, is a historic train station located at Lewistown, Lewis County, Missouri. It was built in 1871 by the Quincy, Missouri, and Pacific Railroad, and is a one-story, gable roofed, frame building with wide overhanging eaves. It measures 24 feet, 6 inches, by 50 feet, 6 inches, and is sheathed in vertical board and batten siding. It was moved to its present location in 1977 to house a community centre.

It was listed on the National Register of Historic Places in 1979 as the Quincy, Missouri, and Pacific Railroad Station.
