= Tolona, Missouri =

Unincorporated community in Missouri, U.S.

Coordinates: 40°02′35″N 91°44′55″W

Tolona is an unincorporated community in Lewis County, in the U.S. state of Missouri.

== History ==
Tolona was founded in 1872, and named by postal officials. A post office called Tolona was established in 1872, and remained in operation until 1938. An old variant name was "Blue Grass".
