= A.C. Waltman House =

Historic house in Missouri, United States

- U.S. National Register of Historic Places
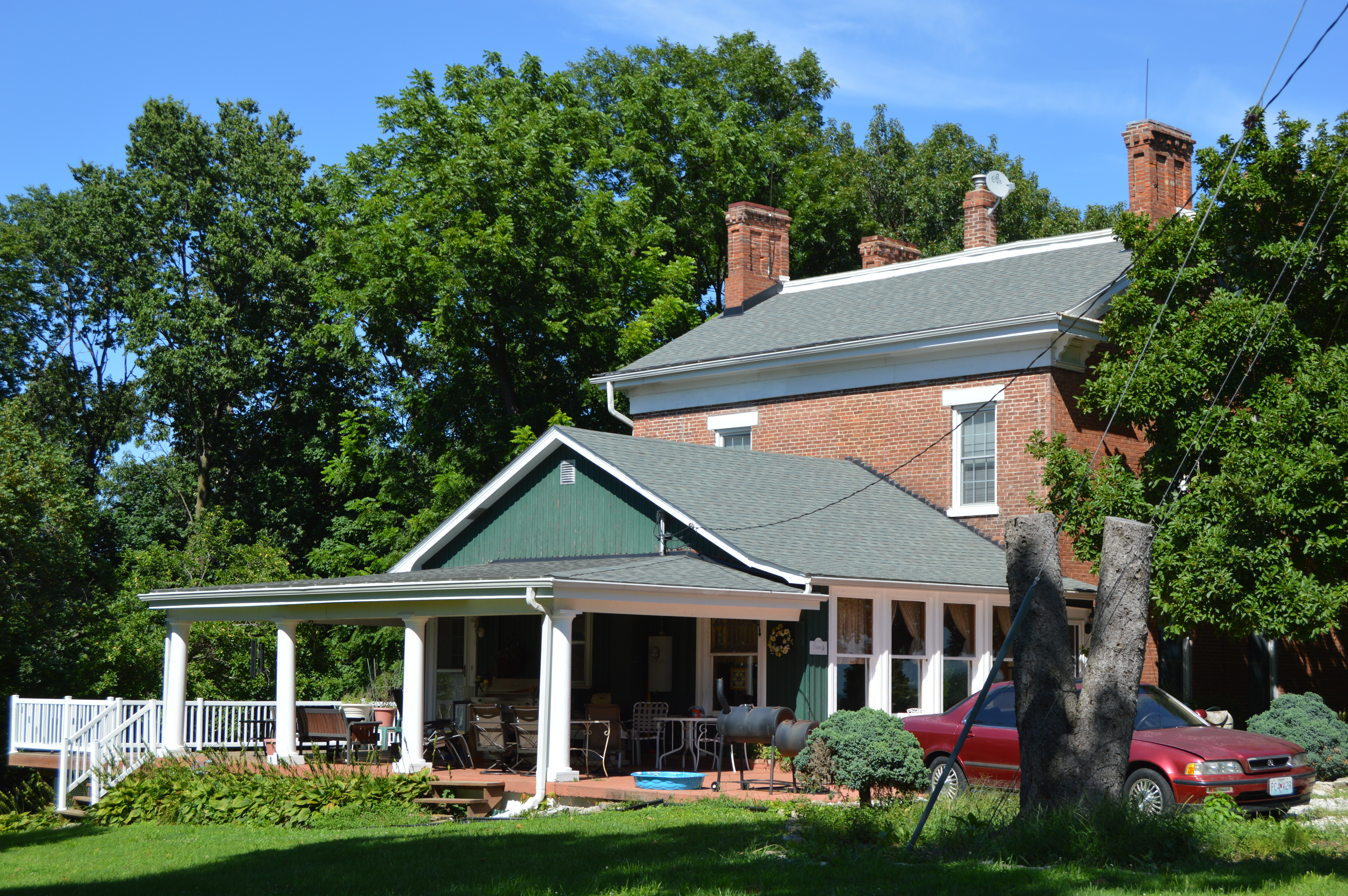
- A.C. Waltman House, July 2015

- Location within Missouri Location within the United States
- Location: 302 Lewis St., La Grange, Missouri
- Coordinates: 40°2′25″N 91°30′2″W
- Area: less than one acre
- Built: c. 1853
- Built by: Waltman, A.C.
- Architectural style: Greek Revival, Italianate
- MPS: La Grange, Missouri MPS
- NRHP reference No.: 99000663
- Added to NRHP: June 3, 1999

A.C. Waltman House, also known as Carl Adams House, is a historic home located at La Grange, Lewis County, Missouri. It was built about 1853, and is a 2 1/2-story, three-bay, massed plan, brick dwelling with Greek Revival / Italianate style design elements. It has a one-story frame rear ell. It features a flattened gable roof and a full-width front porch supported by tapered, fluted Doric order columns.

It was listed on the National Register of Historic Places in 1999.
