= 2005 United States federal budget =

2005 Budget of the United States federal government
- Submitted: February 2, 2004
- Submitted by: George W. Bush
- Submitted to: 108th Congress
- Country: United States
- Total revenue: $2.036 trillion (requested) $2.15 trillion (actual); 16.7% of GDP (actual)
- Total expenditures: $2.4 trillion (requested) $2.47 trillion (actual); 19.2% of GDP (actual)
- Deficit: $364 billion (requested) $318.3 billion (actual); 2.5% of GDP (actual)
- Debt: $7.905 trillion (at fiscal end); 61.3% of GDP
- GDP: $12.889 trillion
- Website: Office of Management and Budget

The 2005 United States Federal Budget began as a proposal by President George W. Bush to fund government operations for October 1, 2004 – September 30, 2005. The requested budget was submitted to the 108th Congress on February 2, 2004.

== President's proposal ==
=== National Security ===
• proposes increasing defense spending by 7%
• proposes increasing homeland security discretionary spending by 10%
• proposes $1.2 billion for rebuilding Afghanistan
• proposes over $5.7 billion in military and economic assistance to countries supporting the United States in the War on Terror
• proposes a 3.5% pay raise for military personnel
• proposes privatizing 90,000 military housing units by the end of 2005
• proposes a 20% increase for the Transportation Security Administration
• proposes a 9% increase for the Coast Guard
• proposes doubling the level of first responder preparedness grants targeted to high-threat areas
• proposes a 180% in funds for a new agriculture and food defense initiative
• proposes $274 million for a new biosurveillance initiative
• proposes an 11% increase for the FBI, including a $357 million increase for counterterrorism activities

=== Economy ===
• proposes holding discretionary spending growth to below four percent, and non-security related spending to 0.5 percent, less than the rate of inflation
• proposes extending the tax cuts enacted in 2001 and 2003
• proposes new initiatives for tax-favored savings and retirement accounts for all Americans
• proposes a new $250 million grant program for community colleges
• proposes $333 million to help students make the transition from high school to college
• proposes more than $20 billion in small business lending and equity programs
• proposes a 10% increase in funding for the SEC

=== Education ===
• proposes increasing Title I funding by $1 billion, 52% more than in 2001
• proposes $1 billion more for Special Education, a 75% increase since 2001
• proposes a 12% increase for early reading programs
• proposes increasing Pell Grants by $856 million
• proposes to increase funding for Historically Black Colleges and Universities and minority-serving institutions by 30%
• proposes raising loan limits for first-year students, expanding options to offer courses on-line, and increasing loan forgiveness for those teaching certain subjects in high-poverty schools

=== Environment ===
• proposes $237 million to develop the world’s first "zero-emissions" coal-fueled power plant
• proposes a 44% increase for hydrogen and fuel cell R&D
• proposes $58 million more for removing excess wood and brush that fuel fires (Healthy Forests Initiative)
• proposes $65 million for an expanded diesel school bus retrofit program to reduce harmful bus emissions
• proposes $45 million, nearly a 500% increase, for Great Lakes clean-up
• proposes increasing Superfund long-term cleanups by $124 million (nearly a 50-percent increase).

=== Health Care ===
• proposes allowing small businesses to purchase coverage for employees through Association Health Plans
• proposes a refundable tax credit for low-income Americans to access to health insurance
• proposes allowing individuals to deduct the premiums associated with HSAs
• proposes vouchers for substance abuse treatment services to an estimated 100,000 people
• proposes an additional $8.3 million, a near 40% increase, to enhance FDA enforcement of Federal regulations to prevent the introduction or spread of bovine spongiform encephalopathy

=== Faith-Based and Community Initiatives ===
• proposes a four-year $300 million Prisoner Re-Entry initiative
• proposes doubling the Access to Recovery program to $200 million
• proposes more than doubling resources for the Compassion Capital Fund, ($100 million)
• proposes $50 million for mentoring children of prisoners
• proposes over $1 billion for the Corporation for National and Community Service; includes $442 million to support 75,000 AmeriCorps members;
• proposes $225 million to expand the National Senior Service Corps to 600,000 volunteers
• proposes $1.9 billion in charitable tax incentives

=== Other Priorities ===
• proposes linking the paychecks of government employees to performance
• proposes examining 100% of the government’s program spending within three years
• proposes increases the VA medical care budget 41 percent above 2001 level
• proposes a $400 million increase and the 2nd installment of the five-year HIV/AIDS plan
• proposes $2.5 billion for the [Millennium Challenge Corporation | Millennium Challenge Account]
• proposes $3 billion over five years in Federal and State funds to promote marriage and healthy family development including abstinence by teens
• proposes doubling the funding for Abstinence Education grants
• proposes $52 million increase for child abuse prevention through the Child Abuse Prevention and Treatment Act (CAPTA) State Grants and the Community-Based Child Abuse Prevention (CBCAP) program.
• proposes $240 million annually in dollar-for-dollar State match program to develop innovative approaches to promoting healthy marriage and reducing out-of-wedlock births
• proposes $50 million to assist non-custodial fathers in becoming more involved in their children’s lives
• proposes an additional $23 million for schools that want to use drug testing to save children’s lives.
• proposes completing the International Space Station, retiring the shuttle by 2010, and focusing on a new space exploration vehicle capable of new space exploration missions to the Moon, Mars, and beyond.

== Congressional action ==
On March 5, 2004, Senate Concurrent Resolution 95, sponsored by Senator Don Nickles, was introduced in the Senate. Debate occurred in the Senate from March 8 to 12 and the Senate adopted an amended resolution shortly after 1 a.m. Friday March 12, 2004 with a vote of 51 to 45 along strict party lines except for Zell Miller, Democrat of Georgia, voting Yea. The resolution was then sent to the House.

House Concurrent Resolution 393 was introduced in the House on March 19, 2004 sponsored by Representative Nussle. The resolution was agreed to in the House on March 25 by a vote of 215 - 212; all 215 Yea votes came from Republicans while all Democrats, the Independent Bernie Sanders, and 10 Republicans voted Nay. On March 29, the House amended Senate Resolution 95 to contain the text from House Resolution 393 and agreed to the resolution as amended.

The versions from each chamber being different, a conference committee was convened. The House appointed Representatives Nussle, Portman and Spratt; the Senate appointed Senators Nickles, Domenici, Grassley, Gregg, Conrad, Hollings, and Sarbanes. The committee filed its conference report (House Report 108-498) on May 19, and the House agreed to the conference report later that day by a vote of 216 - 213. The Senate never took up consideration of the report, therefore Congress ultimately did not finalize a budget resolution for fiscal year 2005. In lieu of a budget resolution, the House passed H.R. 649 which resolved that once the House adopts the conference report: "(1) the provisions of the conference report and its joint explanatory statement shall have force and effect in the House" and "(2) for purposes of title III of the Congressional Budget Act of 1974, the conference report shall be considered adopted by the Congress." The Senate laid out the budget allocations as part (Section 14007) of the Defense Appropriations Act, 2005.

=== Enacted Appropriations ===
Public Law #	Description	Passed House	Passed Senate	Signed by President
108‑287	Department of Defense Appropriations Act, 2005	07/22/2004 roll call vote (original bill passed in the House on 06/22/2004)	07/22/2004 roll call vote (bill with amendment(s) passed in the Senate on 06/24/2004)	08/05/2004
108‑309	Continuing appropriations through 11/20/2004	09/29/2004 roll call vote	09/29/2004 unanimous consent	09/30/2004
108‑335	District of Columbia Appropriations Act, 2005	10/06/2004 roll call vote (original bill passed in the House on 07/20/2004)	10/06/2004 unanimous consent (bill with amendment(s) passed in the Senate on 09/22/2004)	10/18/2004
108‑324	Military Construction Appropriations and Emergency Hurricane Supplemental Appropriations Act, 2005	10/09/2004 roll call vote (original bill passed in the House on 07/22/2004)	10/11/2004 voice vote (bill with amendments passed in the Senate on 09/20/2004)	10/13/2004
108‑334	Department of Homeland Security Appropriations Act, 2005	10/09/2004 roll call vote (original bill passed in the House on 06/18/2004)	10/11/2004 voice vote (House bill with amendment(s) passed in the Senate on 09/14/2004)	10/18/2004
108‑416	Continuing appropriations through 12/3/2004	11/20/2004 voice vote	11/20/2004 unanimous consent	11/21/2004
108‑434	Continuing appropriations through 12/8/2004	11/24/2004 unanimous consent	11/24/2004 unanimous consent	12/03/2004
108‑447	Consolidated Appropriations Act, 2005; Omnibus Appropriation covering: Agriculture, Commerce, Energy/Water, Foreign Operations, Interior, Labor/HHS/ED, Leg Branch, Transportation/Treasury, VA/HUD, Small Business, Other Matters	11/20/2004 roll call vote (original bill passed in the House on 07/15/2004)	11/20/2004 roll call vote (bill with amendments passed in the Senate on 09/23/2004)	12/08/2004
109‑13	Emergency Supplemental Appropriations Act for Defense, the Global War on Terror, and Tsunami Relief, 2005	05/05/2005 roll call vote (original bill passed in the House on 03/16/2005)	05/10/2005 roll call vote (bill with amendments passed in the Senate on 04/21/2005)	05/11/2005
109‑61	Emergency Supplemental Appropriations Act to Meet Immediate Needs Arising From the Consequences of Hurricane Katrina, 2005	09/02/2005 voice vote	09/02/2005 unanimous consent	09/02/2005
109‑62	Second Emergency Supplemental Appropriations Act to Meet Immediate Needs Arising From the Consequences of Hurricane Katrina, 2005	09/08/2005 roll call vote	09/08/2005 roll call vote	09/08/2005

== Total revenue and spending ==
=== Receipts ===
2005 Actual Receipts by Source
1. Individual income tax (43.0%)
2. Social Security/other payroll tax (36.9%)
3. Corporate income tax (12.9%)
4. Excise tax (3.40%)
5. Estate and gift taxes (1.20%)
6. Customs duties (1.10%)
7. Other miscellaneous receipts (1.50%)

Receipts by source: (in billions of dollars)

Source	Requested	Actual
Individual income tax	$874	$927
Corporate income tax	$230	$278
Social Security and other payroll tax	$794	$794
Excise tax	$73	$73
Estate and gift taxes	$21	$25
Customs duties	$22	$23
Other miscellaneous receipts	$22	$33
Total	$2,036	$2,154

=== Outlays ===
Outlays by budget function: (in millions)

Function	Title	Actual
050	National Defense	$495,294
150	International Affairs	$34,565
250	General Science, Space and Technology	$23,597
270	Energy	$440
300	Natural Resources and Environment	$27,983
350	Agriculture	$26,565
370	Commerce and Housing Credit	$7,566
400	Transportation	$67,894
450	Community and Regional Development	$26,262
500	Education, Training, Employment and Social Services	$97,555
550	Health	$250,548
570	Medicare	$298,638
600	Income Security	$345,847
650	Social Security	$523,305
700	Veterans Benefits and Services	$70,120
750	Administration of Justice	$40,019
800	General Government	$16,997
900	Net Interest	$183,986
920	Allowances	$ -
950	Undistributed Offsetting Receipts	$−65,224
	Total	$2,471.957

=== Deficit/Surplus ===
The proposed budget contained an estimated deficit of $364 billion.
The actual deficit for the fiscal year was $318.3 billion (2.5% of GDP).
