= Fred Rhoda House =

Historic house in Missouri, United States

- U.S. National Register of Historic Places
- Location within Missouri Location within the United States
- Location: 200 S. Second St., La Grange, Missouri
- Coordinates: 40°2′27″N 91°29′57″W
- Area: 9 acres (3.6 ha)
- Built: 1854
- Architectural style: Greek Revival
- MPS: La Grange, Missouri MPS
- NRHP reference No.: 99000662
- Added to NRHP: June 3, 1999

Fred Rhoda House, also known as Cottrell House and Goldie Dickerson House, is a historic home located in La Grange, Lewis County, Missouri. It was built about 1854, and is a two-story, central-bay brick I-house with some Greek Revival styling. It has a one-story brick rear ell with frame addition.

It was listed on the National Register of Historic Places in 1999.
