= Laura, Missouri =

Unincorporated community in Missouri, U.S.

Coordinates: 40°13′17″N 91°36′06″W

Laura is an unincorporated community in Lewis County, in the U.S. state of Missouri.

== History ==
Laura was laid out in 1893. A post office called Laura was established in 1892, and remained in operation until 1902. The identity of Laura's namesake has been lost to history.
