= John McKoon House =

Historic house in Missouri, United States

- U.S. National Register of Historic Places
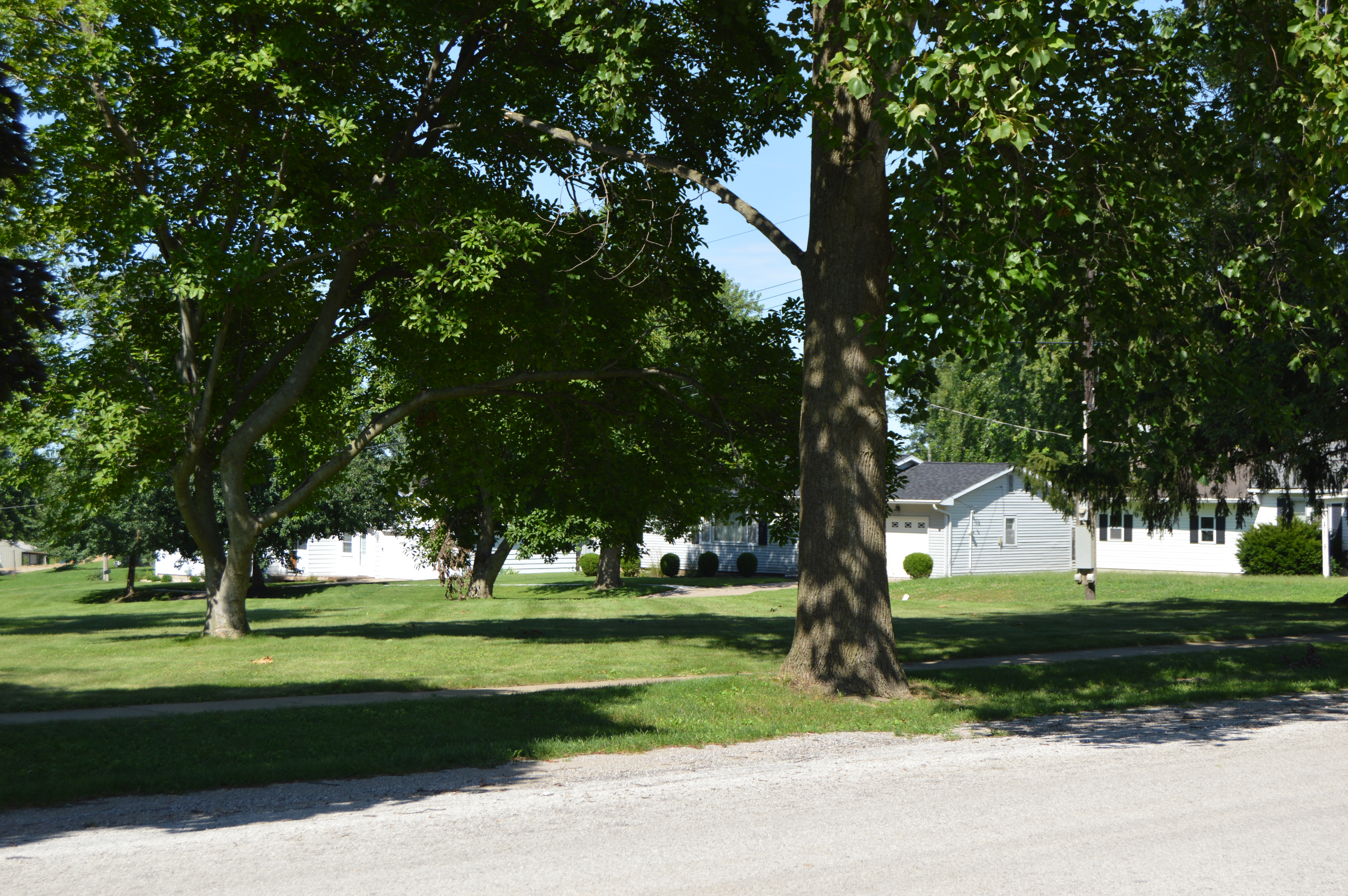
- John McKoon House site, July 2015

- Location within Missouri Location within the United States
- Location: 500 W. Monroe St., La Grange, Missouri
- Coordinates: 40°2′43″N 91°30′7″W
- Area: less than one acre
- Built: c. 1857, c. 1877
- Architectural style: Greek Revival, I-house
- MPS: La Grange, Missouri MPS
- NRHP reference No.: 99000665
- Added to NRHP: June 3, 1999

John McKoon House, also known as Johnson House, was a historic home located at La Grange, Lewis County, Missouri. It was built about 1857, and was a two-story, five-bay, brick I-house with Greek Revival style design elements. It had a 1 1/2-story brick rear ell enlarged about 1876. It featured an original two story portico with square wood columns and a simple wide cornice with delicately scaled dentil molding. It has been demolished.

It was listed on the National Register of Historic Places in 1999.
