= Lewis County Courthouse (Missouri) =

- U.S. National Register of Historic Places
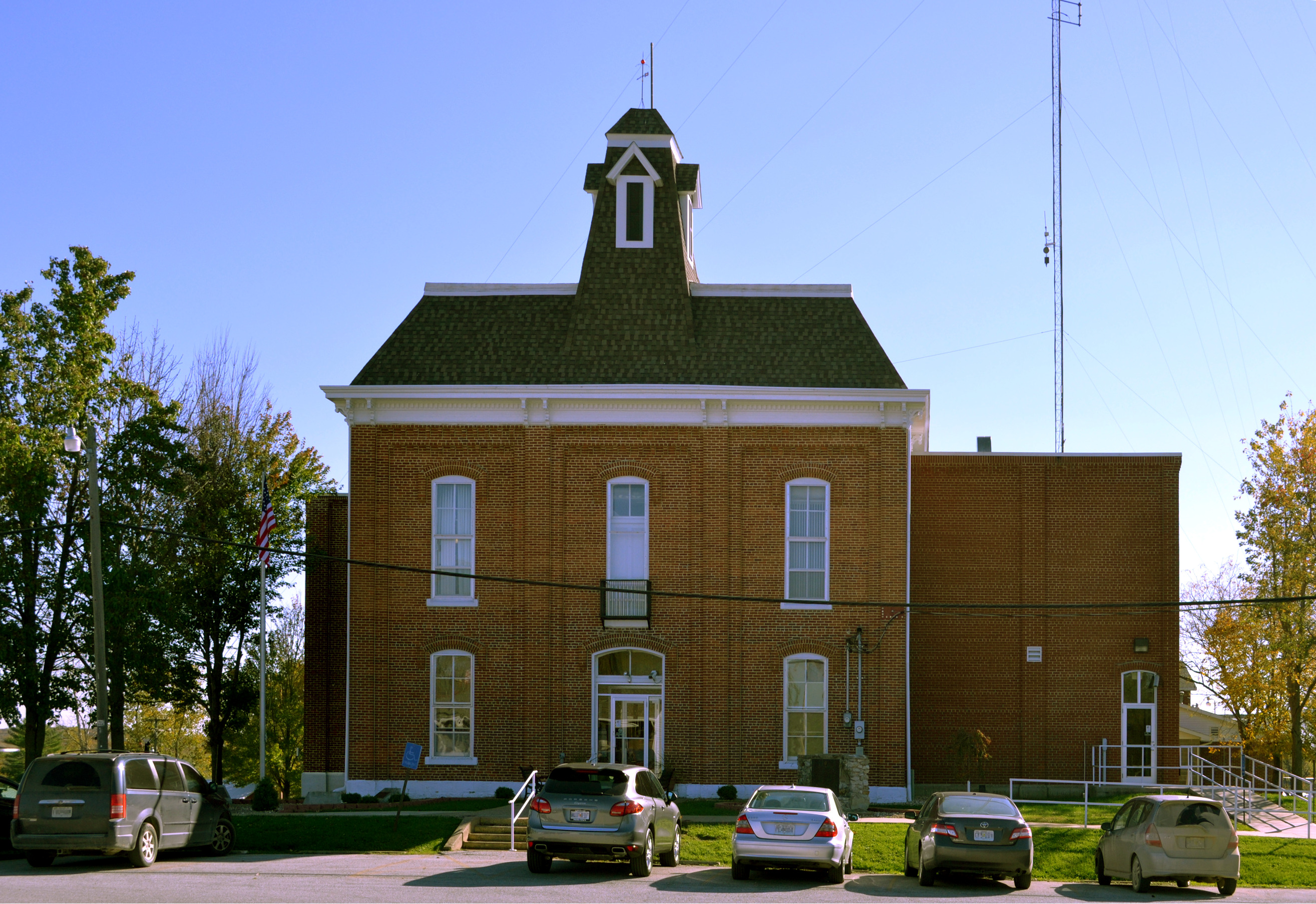
- The courthouse in 2014

- Location within Missouri Location within the United States
- Interactive map showing the location of Lewis County Courthouse
- Location: 100 E. Lafayette St., Monticello, Missouri
- Coordinates: 40°7′5″N 91°42′51″W
- Built: 1875
- Architect: McAllister, J.T.; McAllister & Co.
- Architectural style: Second Empire
- NRHP reference No.: 04001476
- Added to NRHP: January 12, 2005

The Lewis County Courthouse is located at 100 E. Lafayette St. in Monticello, Missouri. The Second Empire style courthouse was designed by J.T. McAllister of McAllister & Co., and built in 1875. It was added to the National Register of Historic Places in 2005.

== Description ==
The two-story brick structure rests on a stone foundation, both believed to be of local origin. As built, the dimensions were 80 feet by 48 feet with the eaves at a height of 32 feet. The first floor ceiling height was 12 feet and the second floor's 18 feet. Three bays, or rooms, were provided on each floor. Since its original construction a series of four additions and internal remodeling have taken place. The building is topped by a mansard roof covered with asphalt, and a distinctive cupola

== History ==
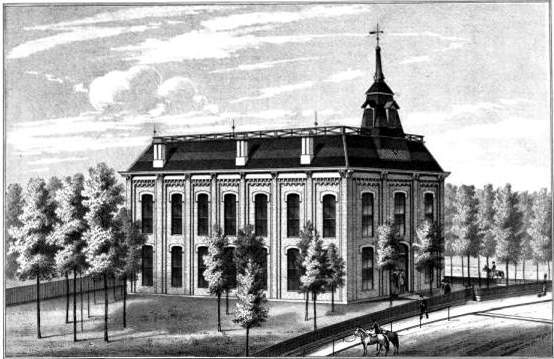
Sketch of the courthouse as it appeared soon after completion.

The current Lewis County courthouse is the third incarnation to serve the county's residents. The first, a primitive one-story log structure, was built in 1834 at a cost of $210. By 1839 it was apparent that a much more substantial building was needed, so $3,200 was appropriated to construct a two-story brick courthouse. Both of these prior buildings were located on or very near the present courthouse location in Monticello, the first being slightly to the west.

On February 24, 1874 Lewis County officials appropriated $10,000 for construction of the current courthouse. However, proponents of relocating the county seat from Monticello seized the opportunity to press their case. Through newspaper articles and public meetings citizens of Canton, La Grange, and Lewistown all made their case citing the current seat's inaccessibility. Lewistown pledged $25,000 toward relocation and new construction while La Grange promised to meet or exceed that offer. Canton topped both, offering to spend not less than $40,000 on a courthouse that would "be an ornament to Lewis County for this and the next generation." However their attempts were in vain as the county officials chose to remain in Monticello and awarded the construction contract to McAllister & Company on March 23, 1875. Work began in April and proceeded rapidly through the following months, with completion and occupation taking place in December, 1875. For a brief time that winter the courthouse also did double duty as a school for the children of Monticello.

The courthouse was first expanded in 1922 as two brick additions, each two-story in height, were added to the east and west sides, respectively. Another two-story addition was constructed on the west side in 2004 to house handicapped accessible restrooms, an elevator, and otherwise make the courthouse compliant with the Americans with Disabilities Acts. The interior has been substantially changed over the building's history as well with drop ceilings, modern HVAC, and modern telecommunications and electrical wiring.
