= Salem, Lewis County, Missouri =

Unincorporated community in the US state of Missouri

Coordinates: 40°01′44″N 91°54′52″W

Salem is an unincorporated community in Lewis County, in the U.S. state of Missouri.

The community took its name from a nearby church of the same name.
