= Sellers, Missouri =

Unincorporated community in Missouri, U.S.

Coordinates: 40°03′59″N 91°40′25″W

Sellers is an unincorporated community in Lewis County, in the U.S. state of Missouri.

== History ==
A post office called Sellers was established in 1890, and remained in operation until 1907. The community has the name of John Sellers, a local merchant.
