= First Presbyterian Church (La Grange, Missouri) =

Historic church in Missouri, United States

- U.S. National Register of Historic Places
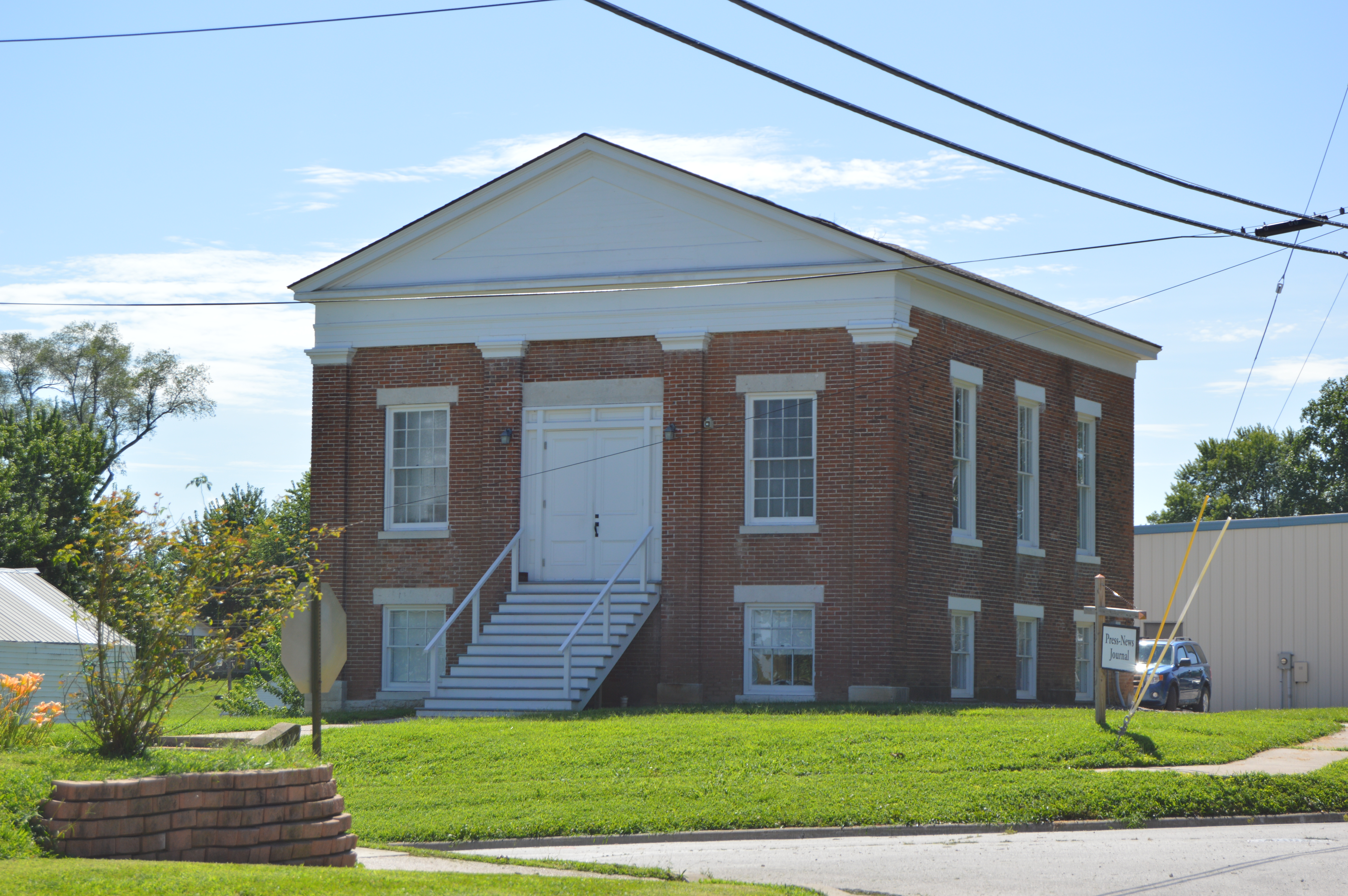
- La Grange First Presbyterian Church, July 2015

- Location within Missouri Location within the United States
- Location: 401 Jefferson, La Grange, Missouri
- Coordinates: 40°2′38″N 91°30′5″W
- Area: less than one acre
- Built: 1848
- Architectural style: Greek Revival
- MPS: La Grange, Missouri MPS
- NRHP reference No.: 12000562
- Added to NRHP: August 28, 2012

First Presbyterian Church is a historic Presbyterian church located at La Grange, Lewis County, Missouri. It was built in 1848, and is a one-story, temple front, Greek Revival style, red brick building on a raised basement. It has a gabled roof with an unadorned wood raked cornice and a pediment on the symmetrical façade.

It was listed on the National Register of Historic Places in 2012.
