= Santuzza, Missouri =

Unincorporated community in Missouri

Coordinates: 40°12′21″N 91°32′04″W

Santuzza (/ˌsæntəˈzeɪ/ SAN-tə-ZAY) is an unincorporated community in Lewis County, in the U.S. state of Missouri.

A post office called Santuzza was established in 1899, and remained in operation until 1902. It is unknown why the name Santuzza was applied to the community.
