= Durgen, Missouri =

Unincorporated community in Missouri, U.S.

Coordinates: 40°04′21″N 91°37′59″W

Durgen is an unincorporated community in Lewis County, in the U.S. state of Missouri.

== History ==
Durgen was platted in 1860. The community took its name from nearby Durgens Creek. A post office called Durgen's Creek was established in 1855, the name was changed to Durgen in 1895, and the post office closed in 1905.
