= Dover, Lewis County, Missouri =

Unincorporated community in Missouri, U.S.

Coordinates: 40°00′44″N 91°35′47″W

Dover is an unincorporated community in Lewis County, in the U.S. state of Missouri.

The community took its name from a nearby Baptist church of the same name.
