= William Gray House =

Historic house in Missouri, United States

- U.S. National Register of Historic Places
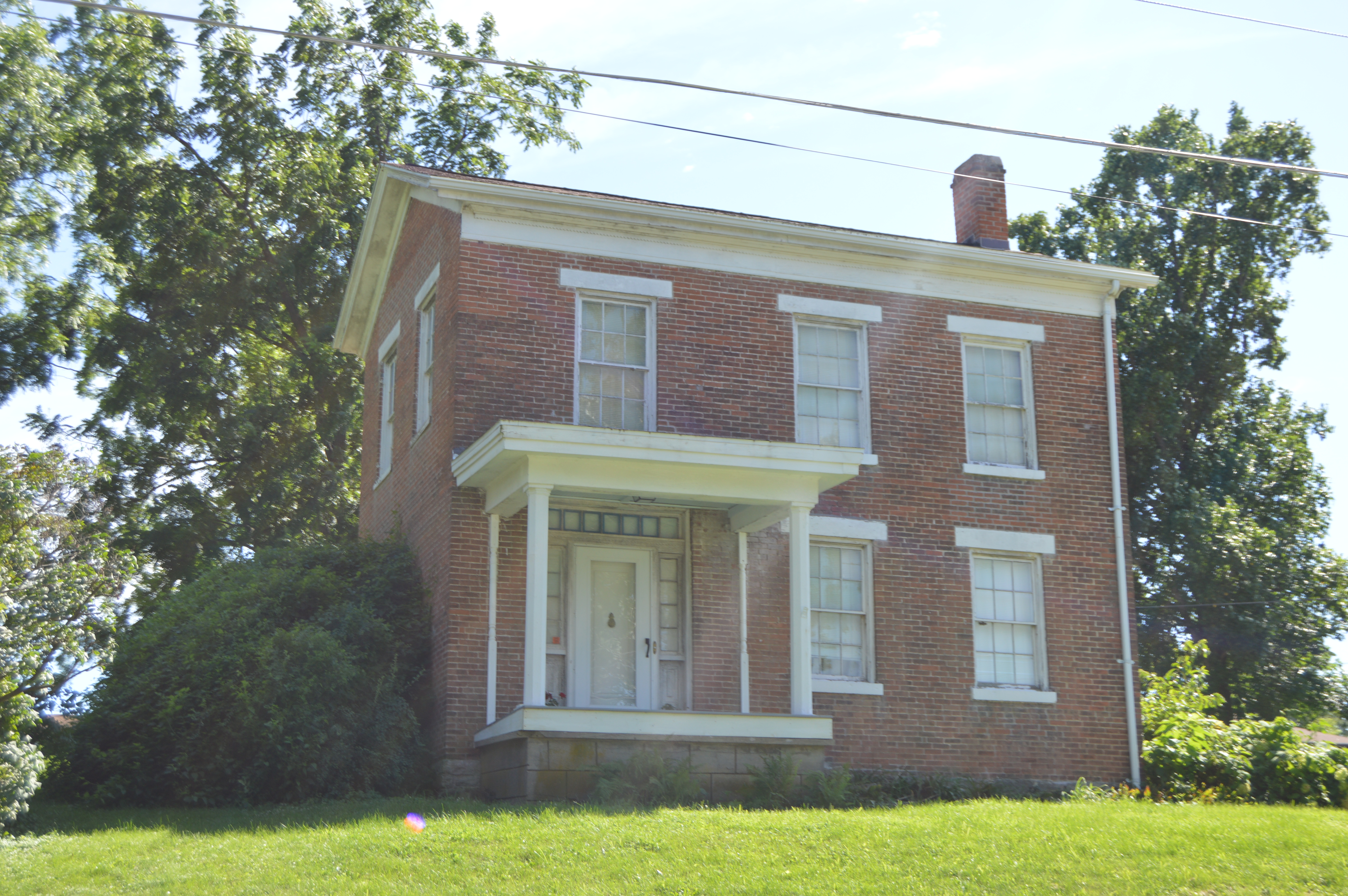
- William Gray House, July 2015

- Location within Missouri Location within the United States
- Location: 407 Washington Street, La Grange, Missouri
- Coordinates: 40°2′34″N 91°30′7″W
- Area: less than one acre
- Built: c. 1860
- Architectural style: Greek Revival, I-house
- MPS: La Grange, Missouri MPS
- NRHP reference No.: 99000666
- Added to NRHP: June 3, 1999

The William Gray House (also known as the G. H. Simpson House) is a historic house located at 407 Washington Street in La Grange, Lewis County, Missouri.

== Description and history ==
It was built in about 1860, and is a two-story, three bay wide, side hall plan, brick I-house with Greek Revival style design elements. It has a long one-story brick rear ell and a one-story front porch that surrounds the main entrance.

It was listed on the National Register of Historic Places on June 3, 1999.
