= La Belle, Missouri =

- City
- Location of La Belle, Missouri
- Coordinates: 40°17′00″N 91°54′53″W
- Country: United States
- State: Missouri
- County: Lewis

Area
  - Total: 0.68 sq mi (1.77 km^{2})
  - Land: 0.68 sq mi (1.76 km^{2})
  - Water: 0.0039 sq mi (0.01 km^{2})
- Elevation: 738 ft (225 m)

Population (2020)
  - Total: 664
  - Density: 976.9/sq mi (377.18/km^{2})
- Time zone: UTC-6 (Central (CST))
  - Summer (DST): UTC-5 (CDT)
- ZIP code: 63447
- Area code: 660
- FIPS code: 29-39512
- GNIS feature ID: 2395561

La Belle is a city in western Lewis County, Missouri, United States. The population was 664 at the 2020 census. It is part of the Quincy, IL–MO Micropolitan Statistical Area.

== History ==
A post office called La Belle has been in operation since 1856. The first permanent settlement at La Belle was made in 1857, and the town site platted in 1871. La Belle is derived from the French meaning "the beautiful", and the settlement was so named from its scenic setting.

The city of La Belle was incorporated in 1872, although it had been a village and stage coach stop much earlier.

== Geography ==
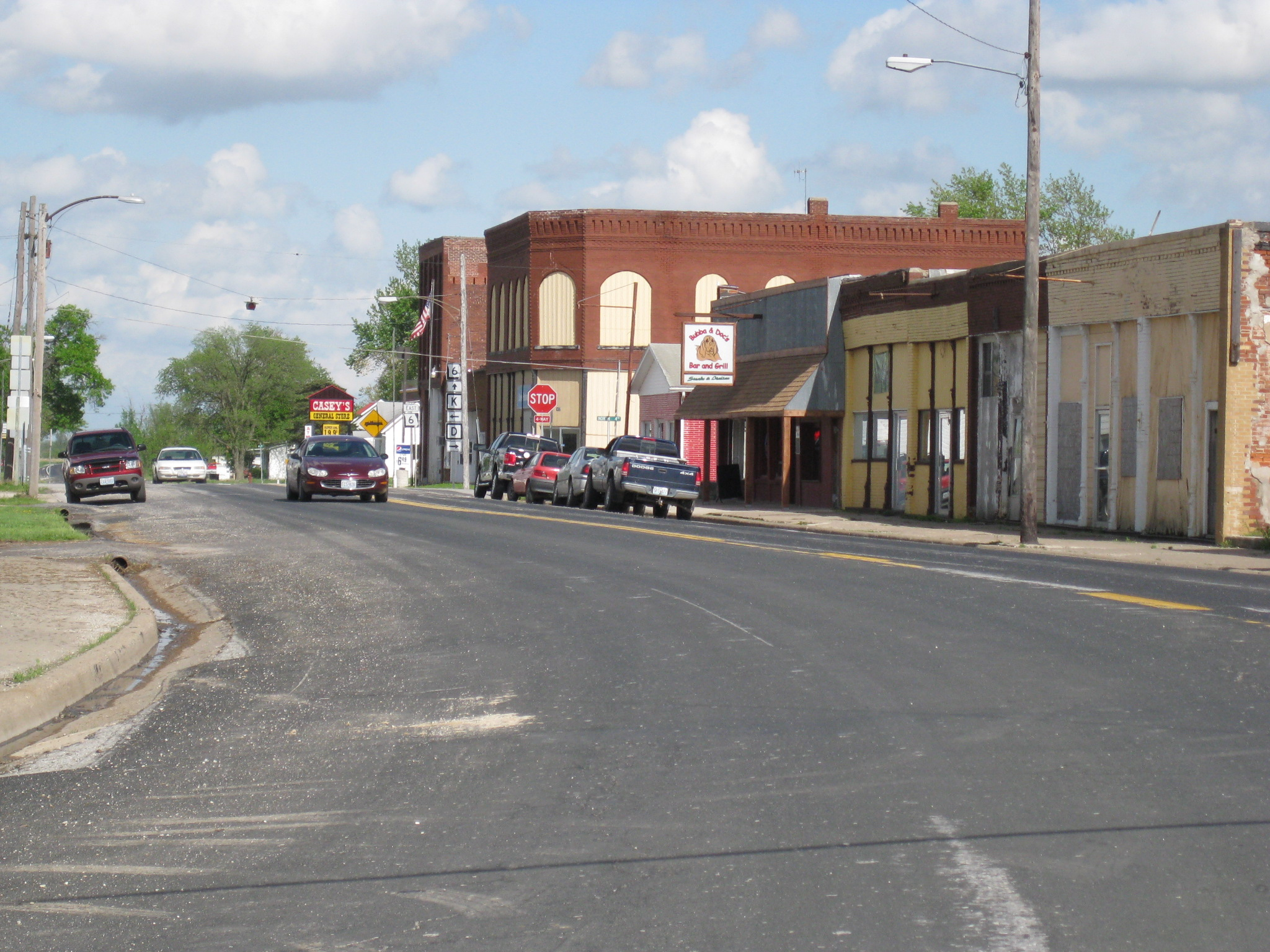
Missouri Highway 6 (State Street) through La Belle Missouri

La Belle is located at 40°6′56″N 91°54′57″W (40.115624, -91.915919).

According to the United States Census Bureau, the city has a total area of 0.68 square miles (1.76 km^{2}), all land.

La Belle is located on Missouri Route 6, which is collinear with State Street throughout much of the city.

== Demographics ==
Historical population
Census	Pop.	Note	%±
1880	341		—
1890	702		105.9%
1900	966		37.6%
1910	1,017		5.3%
1920	878		−13.7%
1930	820		−6.6%
1940	833		1.6%
1950	840		0.8%
1960	866		3.1%
1970	848		−2.1%
1980	845		−0.4%
1990	655		−22.5%
2000	669		2.1%
2010	660		−1.3%
2020	664		0.6%
U.S. Decennial Census

=== 2010 census ===
As of the census of 2010, there were 660 people, 277 households, and 149 families residing in the city. The population density was 970.6 inhabitants per square mile (374.8/km^{2}). There were 351 housing units at an average density of 516.2 per square mile (199.3/km^{2}). The racial makeup of the city was 92.9% White, 5.6% African American, and 1.5% from two or more races. Hispanic or Latino of any race were 2.1% of the population.

There were 277 households, of which 30.0% had children under the age of 18 living with them, 40.1% were married couples living together, 10.1% had a female householder with no husband present, 3.6% had a male householder with no wife present, and 46.2% were non-families. 42.6% of all households were made up of individuals, and 23.1% had someone living alone who was 65 years of age or older. The average household size was 2.22 and the average family size was 3.03.

The median age in the city was 43.3 years. 24.7% of residents were under the age of 18; 6.7% were between the ages of 18 and 24; 20.2% were from 25 to 44; 26.4% were from 45 to 64; and 22.1% were 65 years of age or older. The gender makeup of the city was 49.8% male and 50.2% female.

=== 2000 census ===
As of the census of 2000, there were 669 people, 282 households, and 159 families residing in the city. The population density was 1,052.6 inhabitants per square mile (406.4/km^{2}). There were 338 housing units at an average density of 531.8 per square mile (205.3/km^{2}). The racial makeup of the city was 92.08% White, 5.83% African American, 0.15% Pacific Islander, 1.05% from other races, and 0.90% from two or more races. Hispanic or Latino of any race were 1.79% of the population.

There were 282 households, out of which 26.2% had children under the age of 18 living with them, 44.3% were married couples living together, 7.8% had a female householder with no husband present, and 43.3% were non-families. 37.9% of all households were made up of individuals, and 21.3% had someone living alone who was 65 years of age or older. The average household size was 2.19 and the average family size was 2.89.

In the city the population was spread out, with 23.9% under the age of 18, 7.0% from 18 to 24, 22.0% from 25 to 44, 22.3% from 45 to 64, and 24.8% who were 65 years of age or older. The median age was 43 years. For every 100 females, there were 90.1 males. For every 100 females age 18 and over, there were 80.5 males.

The median income for a household in the city was $21,477, and the median income for a family was $24,000. Males had a median income of $26,917 versus $16,136 for females. The per capita income for the city was $12,424. About 21.2% of families and 28.5% of the population were below the poverty line, including 37.5% of those under age 18 and 25.0% of those age 65 or over.

== Recreation ==
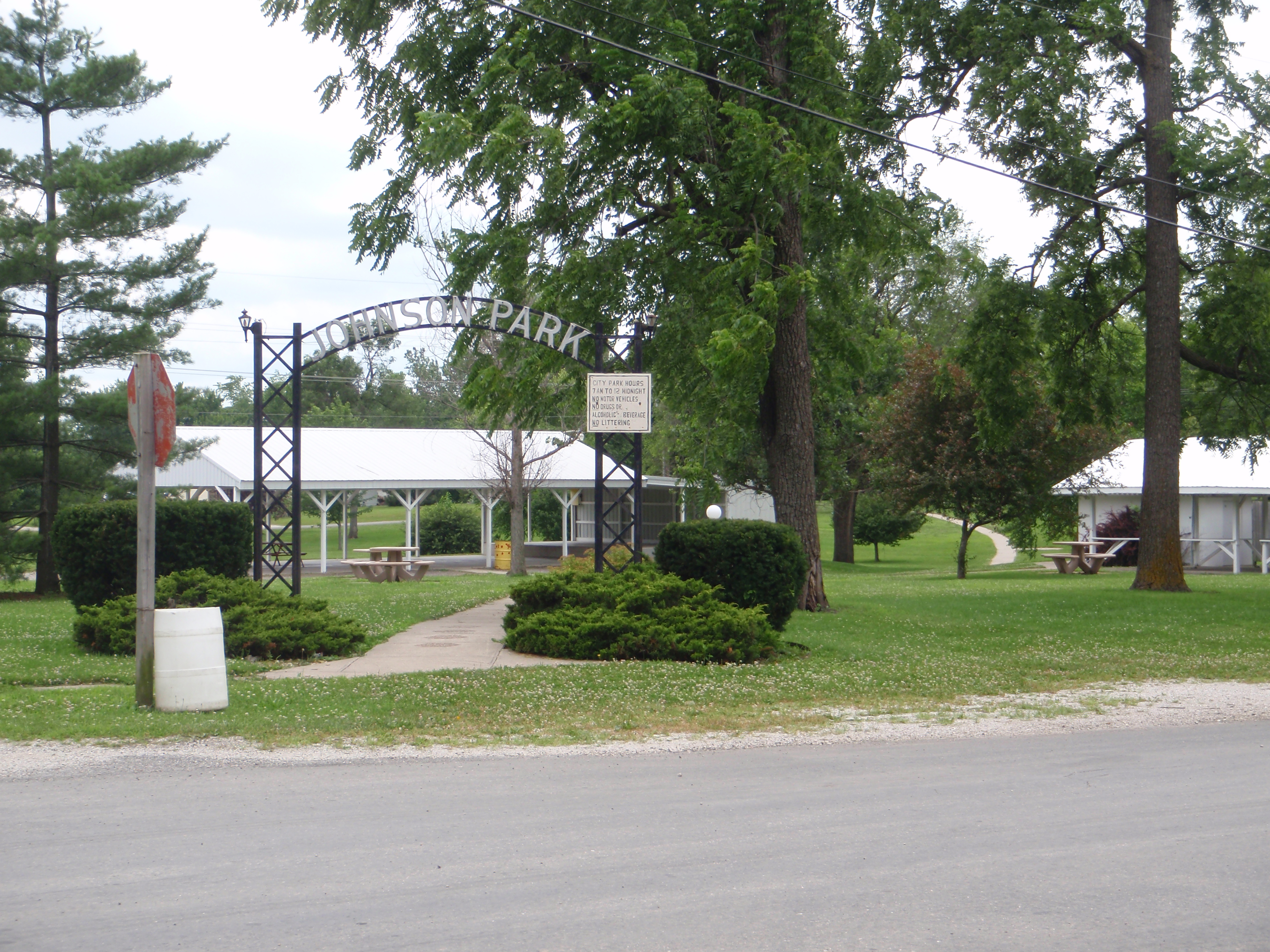
Johnson Park in LaBelle Missouri

La Belle has a city park (Johnson Park) located at the intersection of Wood and Main Street. A baseball field is located on the west end of town, off Highway 6. It hosts summer games for several leagues.

During hunting seasons many hunters come to La Belle and the surrounding area to hunt white-tail deer and turkey. The Missouri Department of Conservation operates a 112-acre (0.45 km^{2}) lake south of La Belle. This lake served as a drinking water reservoir for the city of La Belle from 1980 through 2003.

There has been a branch public library in La Belle since 1935. It became part of the Northeast Missouri Library Service in 1964.

== Education ==
Public education in La Belle is administered by Lewis County C-1 School District. Students from La Belle attend Highland Elementary School and Highland Junior-Senior High School in Ewing.

La Belle has a public library, the Labelle Branch Library.
