= Reddish Township, Lewis County, Missouri =

Township in Lewis County, Missouri, U.S.

Coordinates: 40.1958°N 91.8533°W

Reddish Township is an inactive township in Lewis County, in the U.S. state of Missouri.

Reddish Township was established in 1841, taking its name from Silas Reddish, a pioneer citizen.
