= Joseph Hipkins House =

Historic house in Missouri, United States

- U.S. National Register of Historic Places
- Location within Missouri Location within the United States
- Location: 500 S. 3rd St., La Grange, Missouri
- Coordinates: 40°2′23″N 91°30′3″W
- Area: less than one acre
- Built: c. 1856
- Built by: Hipkins, Joseph
- Architectural style: Greek Revival, I-House
- MPS: La Grange, Missouri MPS
- NRHP reference No.: 08000376
- Added to NRHP: May 8, 2008

Joseph Hipkins House, also known as Jas. T. Howland House, is a historic home located at La Grange, Lewis County, Missouri. It was built about 1856, and is a two-story, three-bay, side hall plan, brick I-house with Greek Revival style design elements. It has a one-story brick rear ell. The house has a low hipped roof with a wide overhang and a deep wooden cornice and features a full-width front porch and wide formal entranceways.

It was listed on the National Register of Historic Places in 2008.
