= Joe Hipkin =

English cricketer

Personal information
- Full name: Joseph Bernard Hipkin
- Born: 8 August 1900; Brancaster, Norfolk, England
- Died: 11 February 1957 (aged 56); Lanarkshire, Scotland
- Batting: Left-handed
- Role: Bowler

Domestic team information
- Years: Team
- 1923–1931: Essex

Career statistics
Competition	FC
Matches	232
Runs scored	4239
Batting average
100s/50s
Top score
Balls bowled
Wickets	522
Bowling average
5 wickets in innings
10 wickets in match
Best bowling
Catches/stumpings
- Source: Cricinfo, 21 July 2013

Joe Hipkin (8 August 1900 – 11 February 1957), full name Joseph Bernard Hipkin, was an English cricketer. He played for Essex between 1923 and 1931. After his retirement from cricket, he became a security officer.
