= Alfred James Hipkins =

English musicologist (1826–1903)

Alfred James Hipkins FSA (17 June 1826 – 3 June 1903) was an English musician, musicologist and musical antiquary.

In 1840, at the age of 14, Hipkins became an apprentice piano tuner in the pianoforte factory of John Broadwood & Sons Ltd. In 1846, he was charged with training all of Broadwood's tuners in equal temperament, as many were still using the older meantone system. In 1849, he was named to the status of "senior workman", and he remained an employee of this company for the rest of his life. Despite having very limited musical training on the pianoforte and the organ, he gained a reputation for his performances of Chopin's music. He wrote many reviews of books on musical ethnology or musical antiquity for The Athenæum and The Musical Times. In 1891 he gave the Cantor lectures on Musical instruments, their construction and capabilities to the Royal Society of Arts.

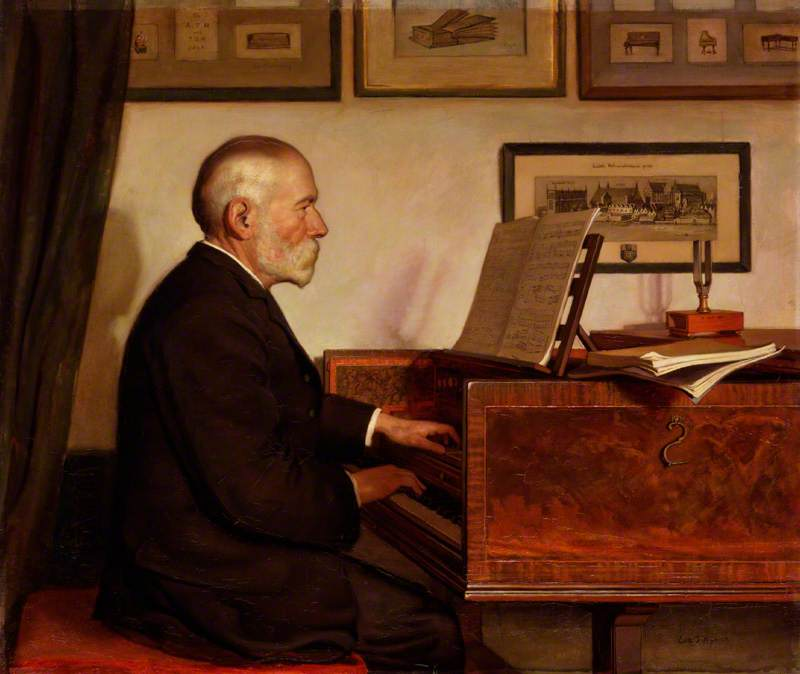
Painting of A.J. Hipkins by his daughter Edith

His chief energies were devoted to a study of the science of music and of the history and quality of keyboard instruments. On the latter subject he became an unrivalled authority. He wrote profusely on musical history, contributing 134 articles to 'Grove's Dictionary', and several to the ninth edition of the 'Encyclopædia Britannica'. In 1881 he made a journey through Germany to examine historic pianofortes in the royal palaces, in particular the Gottfried Silbermann pianofortes that had belonged to Frederick the Great. He verified that they were made after the design of Bartolomeo Cristofori, rather than that of Christoph Schroeter, as had previously been believed. His major publications were 'Musical Instruments, Historic, Rare, and Unique' (1881), a standard work illustrated in colour by William Gibb; and 'Description and history of the pianoforte and of the older keyboard stringed instruments' (1896).

Hipkins married in October 1850 and the marriage produced a son John, who became a noted wood-engraver, and a daughter Edith, who became a highly successful portrait painter.

Hipkins, Carl Engel and Thomas Taphouse created three of the outstanding antiquarian collections of musical instruments in the U.K. According to his will, the Royal Institution received his collection of tuning forks and the Royal College of Music received his collection of musical instruments.

Hipkins's performances on harpsichord and clavichord, notably of Bach's "Goldberg" Variations and Chromatic Fantasy and Fugue, exerted a strong influence on Arnold Dolmetsch and other early musicians and were highly praised by George Bernard Shaw

== Selected works ==
- "The old clavier or keyboard instruments; their use by composers, and technique". Proceedings of the Musical Association: 139–145. 7 June 1886.
- Musical instruments, historic, rare and unique; the selection, introduction and descriptive notes by A.J. Hipkins. Illustrated by a series of fifty plates in colours, drawn by William Gibb. A. and C. Black. 1888.
- Description and history of the pianoforte and of the older keyboard stringed instruments / by A. J. Hipkins; the wood engravings by John Hipkins. Novello, Ewer and co's music primers and educational series ... [no. 52]. Novello, Ewer and co. 1896. reprinted in 1975 with an introduction by Edwin M. Ripin
- Dorian and Phrygian reconsidered from a non-harmonic point of view. 1902. reprinted in Greek music. 1930.
