= Edith Hipkins =

British painter

Edith J. Hipkins
- Born: 1854
- Died: 1945 (aged 90–91)
- Known for: Painting
- Movement: Pre-Raphaelite

Edith Hipkins (1854–1945) was a British portrait and genre painter. She exhibited five paintings at the Royal Academy of Arts (RA) between 1883 and 1898.

== Life ==
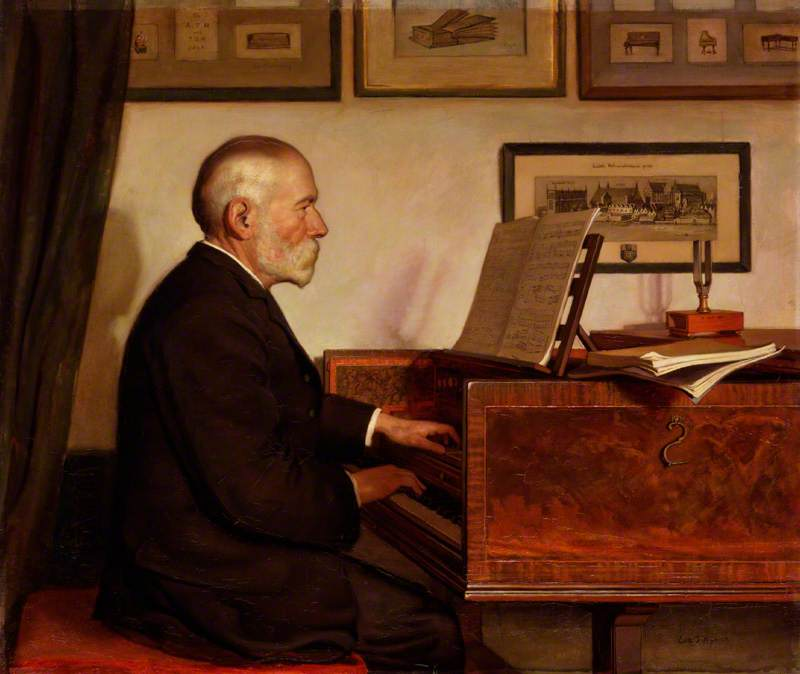
Alfred James Hipkins by Edith J. Hipkins, oil on canvas, 1898

Hipkins was the daughter of Jane Souter (née Black) and the musicologist Alfred James Hipkins. She painted two paintings that are now in national collections. One (With thy sweet fingers, exhibited at the RA in 1883) is in the collection of the Royal Academy of Music and the other (titled as a Portrait of a Gentleman at the RA in 1898) a portrait of her father, is in the National Portrait Gallery in London. Further exhibits at the Royal Academy of Arts were Hickory Dickory Dock in 1884 and Morning and Evening in 1897.

The Hipkins family lived in West London and were part of a social set that included painters, writers and musicians. The artist Laurence Alma-Tadema and his family were particularly close to Edith and her father, and the two families spent much time together. Others in the circle included Edward Burne-Jones, John Everett Millais, William Holman Hunt and George Frederic Watts. The Hipkins family also corresponded extensively with many of the great artists of the day, both within and beyond their circle. Many praised Edith's artistic skill – Burne-Jones even offered to mentor her.

In 1937 she published a book entitled How Chopin Played ... based on the notebooks of her late father.

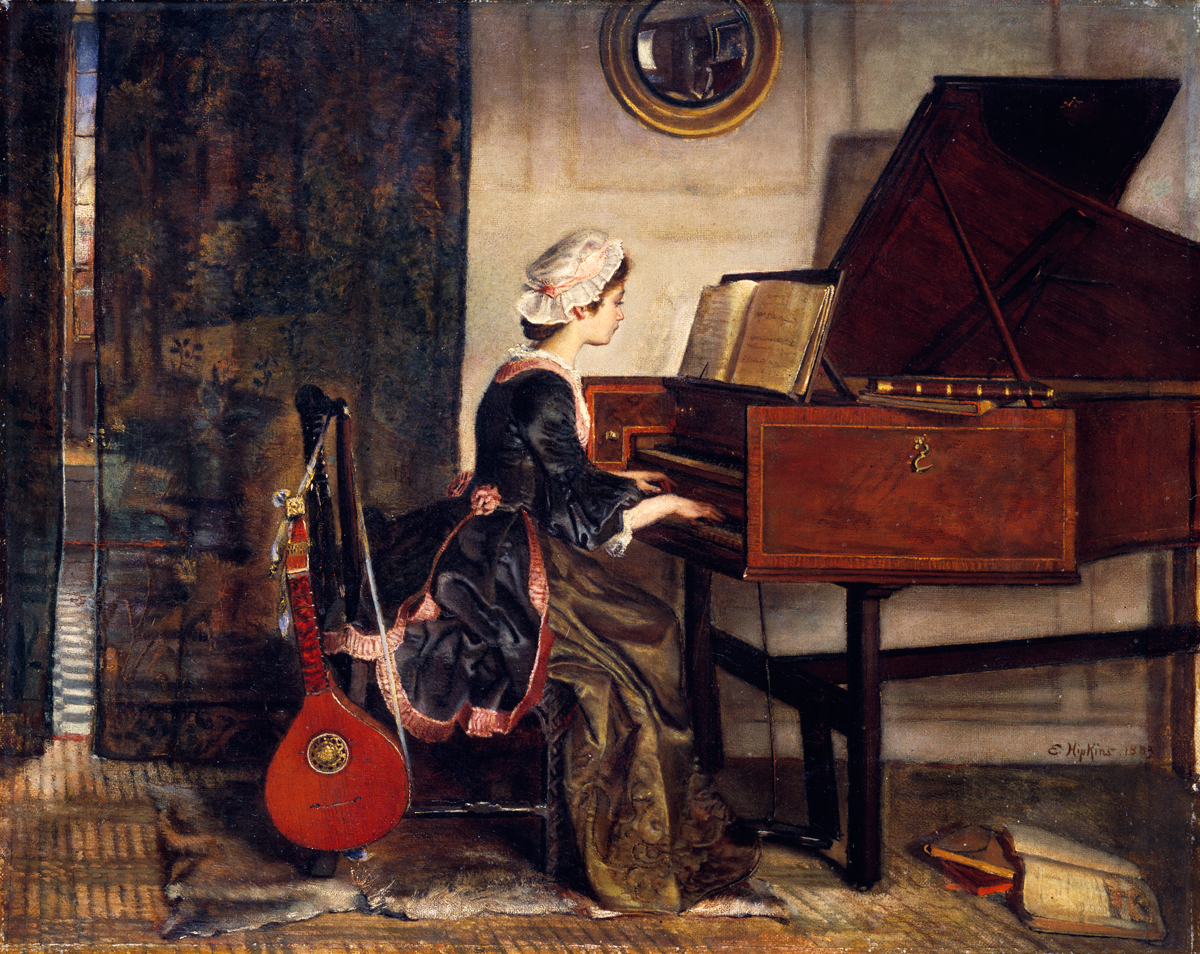
With Thy Sweet Fingers. Edith Hipkins. Oil on canvas.

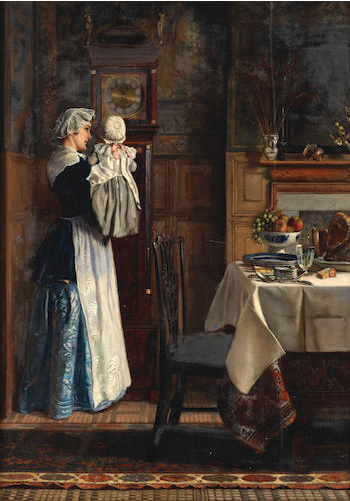
Hickory Dickory Dock. Edith Hipkins. Signed (lower right). Oil on canvas.
