= Lewis County Courthouse (Tennessee) =

- U.S. National Register of Historic Places
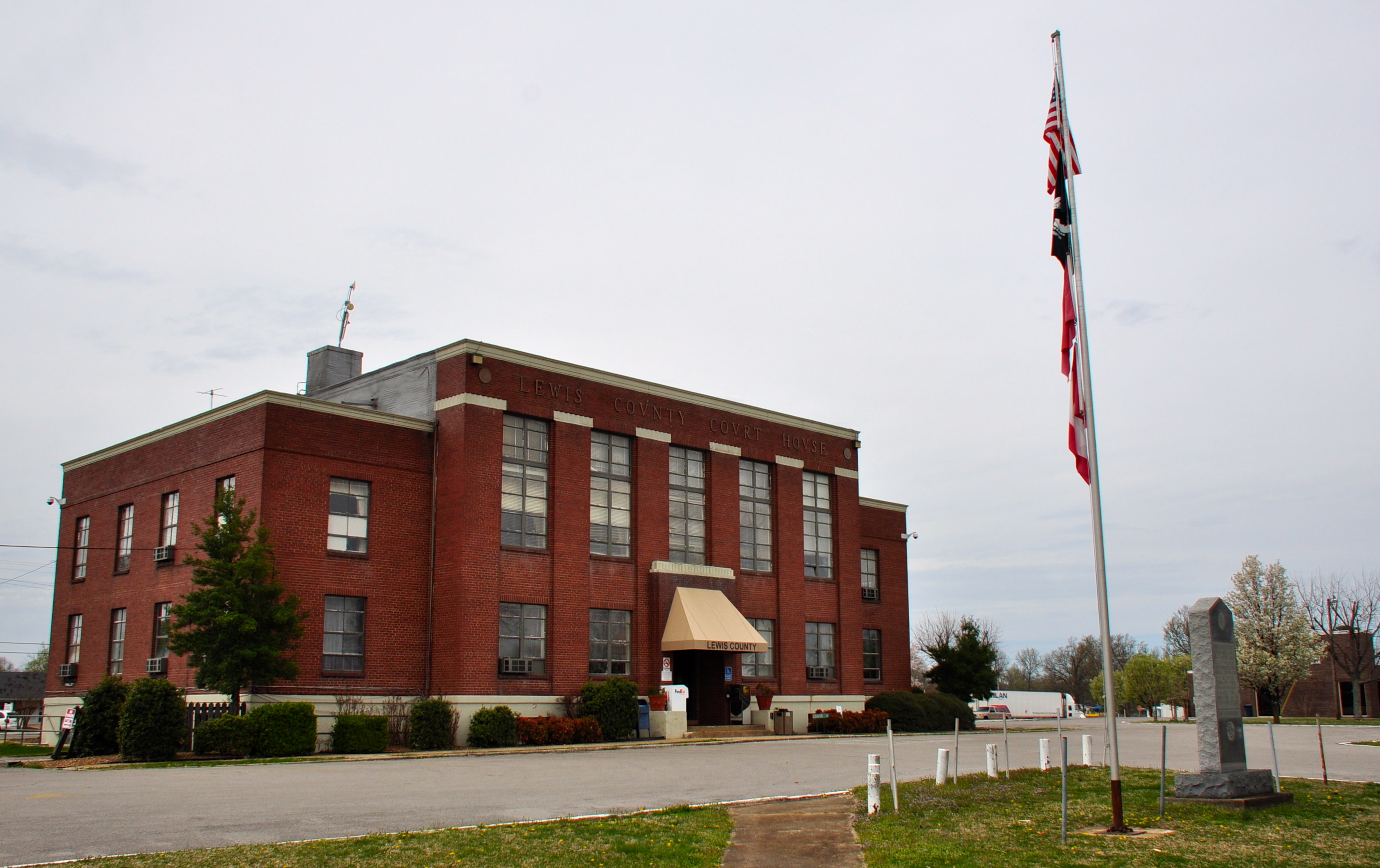
- Lewis County Courthouse, April 2014.

- Location within Tennessee Location within the United States
- Interactive map showing the location of Lewis County Courthouse
- Location: 110 N. Park St., Hohenwald, Tennessee
- Coordinates: 35°33′5″N 87°33′10″W
- Area: 3 acres (1.2 ha)
- Built: 1939
- Built by: Chrichlow and Yearwood
- Architect: Hart & Russell
- Architectural style: Art Deco, PWA Moderne
- NRHP reference No.: 06000203
- Added to NRHP: March 29, 2006

Lewis County Courthouse in Hohenwald, Tennessee is a historic courthouse building built in 1939 that is listed on the National Register of Historic Places.

It was deemed significant as "an excellent local example of Public Works Administration (PWA) Modern architecture". It was funded by the Public Works Administration, was designed by Nashville architects Hart & Russell, and was built by Nashville contractor Chrichlow & Yearwood. It is a red brick building. It has three original jail cells on its third floor.
