= Deer Ridge, Missouri =

Unincorporated community in Missouri, U.S.

Coordinates: 40°12′46″N 91°53′45″W

Deer Ridge is an unincorporated community in Lewis County, in the U.S. state of Missouri.

== History ==
A post office called Deer Ridge was established in 1854, and remained in operation until 1906. The community took its name from nearby ridge where deer were abundant.
