= Derrahs Branch =

Stream in the American state of Missouri

Coordinates: 40.2264330°N 91.6446053°W

Derrahs Branch is a stream in Lewis County in the U.S. state of Missouri.

Derrahs Branch has the name of the local Derrah family.

== See also ==
- List of rivers of Missouri
