= Lewistown, Missouri =

- City
- Location of Lewistown, Missouri
- Coordinates: 40°05′05″N 91°48′48″W
- Country: United States
- State: Missouri
- County: Lewis

Area
  - Total: 0.50 sq mi (1.30 km^{2})
  - Land: 0.50 sq mi (1.30 km^{2})
  - Water: 0 sq mi (0.00 km^{2})
- Elevation: 725 ft (221 m)

Population (2020)
  - Total: 521
  - Density: 1,040.3/sq mi (401.67/km^{2})
- Time zone: UTC-6 (Central (CST))
  - Summer (DST): UTC-5 (CDT)
- ZIP code: 63452
- Area code: 573
- FIPS code: 29-41852
- GNIS feature ID: 2396715

Lewistown is a city in Lewis County, Missouri, United States. The population was 521 at the 2020 census. It is part of the Quincy, IL–MO Micropolitan Statistical Area. It is located on Missouri Route 6 near the junction of Route 6 with Missouri Route 16. Lewistown is in the Lewis County C-1 school district.

== History ==
Lewistown was platted in 1871 when the railroad was extended to that point. The community took its name from Lewis County. A post office called Lewiston was established in 1872, and the name was changed to Lewistown in 1897.

The Quincy, Missouri, and Pacific Railroad Station was listed on the National Register of Historic Places in 1979.

== Geography ==
According to the United States Census Bureau, the city has a total area of 0.48 square miles (1.24 km^{2}), all land.

== Demographics ==
Historical population
Census	Pop.	Note	%±
1880	127		—
1890	200		57.5%
1900	358		79.0%
1910	405		13.1%
1920	483		19.3%
1930	494		2.3%
1940	415		−16.0%
1950	415		0.0%
1960	454		9.4%
1970	615		35.5%
1980	502		−18.4%
1990	453		−9.8%
2000	595		31.3%
2010	534		−10.3%
2020	521		−2.4%
U.S. Decennial Census

=== 2010 census ===
As of the census of 2010, there were 534 people, 244 households, and 144 families living in the city. The population density was 1,112.5 inhabitants per square mile (429.5/km^{2}). There were 288 housing units at an average density of 600.0 units per square mile (231.7 units/km^{2}). The racial makeup of the city was 98.5% White, 1.1% African American, and 0.4% from two or more races.

There were 244 households, of which 28.3% had children under the age of 18 living with them, 44.3% were married couples living together, 8.2% had a female householder with no husband present, 6.6% had a male householder with no wife present, and 41.0% were non-families. 37.7% of all households were made up of individuals, and 16% had someone living alone who was 65 years of age or older. The average household size was 2.19 and the average family size was 2.91.

The median age in the city was 41 years. 24.7% of residents were under the age of 18; 6.1% were between the ages of 18 and 24; 24.3% were from 25 to 44; 27.9% were from 45 to 64; and 17% were 65 years of age or older. The gender makeup of the city was 48.1% male and 51.9% female.

=== 2000 census ===
As of the census of 2000, there were 595 people, 262 households, and 166 families living in the town. The population density was 1,321.9 inhabitants per square mile (510.4/km^{2}). There were 309 housing units at an average density of 686.5 units per square mile (265.1 units/km^{2}). The racial makeup of the town was 97.82% White, 1.68% African American, 0.17% Native American, 0.17% from other races, and 0.17% from two or more races. Hispanic or Latino of any race were 0.50% of the population.

There were 262 households, out of which 31.7% had children under the age of 18 living with them, 48.1% were married couples living together, 11.1% had a female householder with no husband present, and 36.3% were non-families. 35.1% of all households were made up of individuals, and 21.8% had someone living alone who was 65 years of age or older. The average household size was 2.27 and the average family size was 2.89.

In the town the population was spread out, with 26.1% under the age of 18, 9.2% from 18 to 24, 21.7% from 25 to 44, 22.4% from 45 to 64, and 20.7% who were 65 years of age or older. The median age was 40 years. For every 100 females, there were 85.9 males. For every 100 females age 18 and over, there were 79.6 males.

The median income for a household in the town was $22,188, and the median income for a family was $38,750. Males had a median income of $22,917 versus $20,000 for females. The per capita income for the town was $12,655. About 19.9% of families and 22.1% of the population were below the poverty line, including 27.3% of those under age 18 and 18.3% of those age 65 or over.

== Education ==
It is in the Lewis County C-1 School District.
