= Ewing, Missouri =

- City
- Location of Ewing, Missouri
- Coordinates: 40°0′32″N 91°42′53″W
- Country: United States
- State: Missouri
- County: Lewis

Area
  - Total: 0.63 sq mi (1.62 km^{2})
  - Land: 0.63 sq mi (1.62 km^{2})
  - Water: 0 sq mi (0.00 km^{2})
- Elevation: 689 ft (210 m)

Population (2020)
  - Total: 406
  - Density: 650.4/sq mi (251.14/km^{2})
- Time zone: UTC-6 (Central (CST))
  - Summer (DST): UTC-5 (CDT)
- ZIP code: 63440
- Area code: 573
- FIPS code: 29-23032
- GNIS feature ID: 2394716

Ewing is a city in Lewis County, Missouri, United States. The population was 406 at the 2020 census. It is part of the Quincy, IL–MO Micropolitan Statistical Area. Ewing is part of the Lewis County C-1 School district. Students attend the nearby Highland Elementary and Highland Junior-Senior High School.

== History ==
A post office called Ewing has been in operation since 1894. The community was named after William Ewing, a pioneer citizen.

== Geography ==
According to the United States Census Bureau, the city has a total area of 0.62 square miles (1.61 km^{2}), all land.

== Demographics ==
Historical population
Census	Pop.	Note	%±
1910	327		—
1920	384		17.4%
1930	340		−11.5%
1940	309		−9.1%
1950	316		2.3%
1960	324		2.5%
1970	330		1.9%
1980	400		21.2%
1990	463		15.8%
2000	464		0.2%
2010	456		−1.7%
2020	406		−11.0%
U.S. Decennial Census

=== 2010 census ===
As of the census of 2010, there were 456 people, 204 households, and 123 families living in the city. The population density was 735.5 inhabitants per square mile (284.0/km^{2}). There were 214 housing units at an average density of 345.2 per square mile (133.3/km^{2}). The racial makeup of the city was 96.9% White, 0.2% African American, 0.7% Asian, and 2.2% from two or more races. Hispanic or Latino of any race were 2.9% of the population.

There were 204 households, of which 27.9% had children under the age of 18 living with them, 50.0% were married couples living together, 6.4% had a female householder with no husband present, 3.9% had a male householder with no wife present, and 39.7% were non-families. 35.3% of all households were made up of individuals, and 19.1% had someone living alone who was 65 years of age or older. The average household size was 2.24 and the average family size was 2.87.

The median age in the city was 43 years. 23.5% of residents were under the age of 18; 4.9% were between the ages of 18 and 24; 24% were from 25 to 44; 26.6% were from 45 to 64; and 21.3% were 65 years of age or older. The gender makeup of the city was 48.2% male and 51.8% female.

=== 2000 census ===
As of the census of 2000, there were 464 people, 197 households, and 130 families living in the city. The population density was 737.1 inhabitants per square mile (284.6/km^{2}). There were 220 housing units at an average density of 349.5 per square mile (134.9/km^{2}). The racial makeup of the city was 99.12% White, 0.22% Native American, 0.22% Pacific Islander, 0.22% from other races, and 0.22% from two or more races.

There were 197 households, out of which 29.4% had children under the age of 18 living with them, 53.8% were married couples living together, 8.1% had a female householder with no husband present, and 34.0% were non-families. 29.4% of all households were made up of individuals, and 19.8% had someone living alone who was 65 years of age or older. The average household size was 2.36 and the average family size was 2.94.

In the city the population was spread out, with 24.6% under the age of 18, 8.2% from 18 to 24, 28.0% from 25 to 44, 19.2% from 45 to 64, and 20.0% who were 65 years of age or older. The median age was 39 years. For every 100 females, there were 100.9 males. For every 100 females age 18 and over, there were 91.3 males.

The median income for a household in the city was $30,000, and the median income for a family was $39,167. Males had a median income of $26,071 versus $23,906 for females. The per capita income for the city was $14,115. About 8.6% of families and 13.8% of the population were below the poverty line, including 17.9% of those under age 18 and 18.7% of those age 65 or over.

== Education ==
It is in the Lewis County C-1 School District.

== Notable person ==
- James Earl Ray, boyhood home after moving here from Bowling Green, Missouri at the age of seven. He moved to his birth home of Alton, Illinois at the age of 16.
