= La Grange, Missouri =

- City
- Location of La Grange, Missouri
- Coordinates: 40°02′49″N 91°30′09″W
- Country: United States
- State: Missouri
- County: Lewis

Area
  - Total: 1.86 sq mi (4.81 km^{2})
  - Land: 1.56 sq mi (4.03 km^{2})
  - Water: 0.30 sq mi (0.78 km^{2})
- Elevation: 597 ft (182 m)

Population (2020)
  - Total: 825
  - Density: 530.1/sq mi (204.69/km^{2})
- Time zone: UTC-6 (Central (CST))
  - Summer (DST): UTC-5 (CDT)
- ZIP code: 63448
- Area code: 655
- FIPS code: 29-39764
- GNIS feature ID: 2395565
- Website: cityoflagrangemo.gov

La Grange is a city in Lewis County, Missouri, United States. The population was 825 at the 2020 census. Since the 1960 census, the population has been dwindling. It is part of the Quincy, IL–MO Micropolitan Statistical Area.

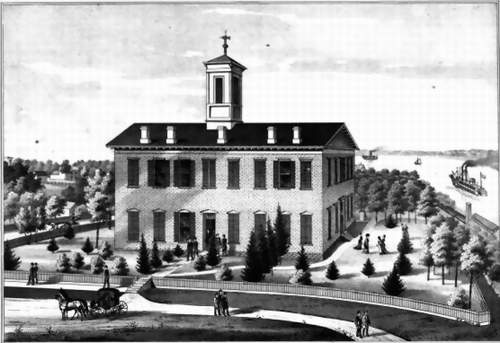
A Mid-1870s sketch of La Grange College.

== History ==
La Grange was founded in 1830. A post office called La Grange has been in operation since 1833.

In 1885, the Supreme Court ruled against the city in Cole v. La Grange. The court found that the city could only use eminent domain powers for public purposes and not to specifically benefit the La Grange Iron and Steel Company.

In 1858 the Southern Baptists opened the LaGrange Male and Female Seminary. It later became LaGrange College, with a two-year junior college program.

In 1928 it moved to Hannibal as Hannibal–LaGrange College (now Hannibal–LaGrange University).

In 2001, the Mark Twain Casino opened in a stationary riverboat.

The First Presbyterian Church, William Gray House, Dr. J.A. Hay House, Joseph Hipkins House, John McKoon House, Fred Rhoda House, and A.C. Waltman House are listed on the National Register of Historic Places.

== Geography ==
La Grange is located at 40°2′32″N 91°30′2″W (40.042347, -91.500440). According to the United States Census Bureau, the city has a total area of 1.86 square miles (4.82 km^{2}), of which 1.56 square miles (4.04 km^{2}) is land and 0.30 square miles (0.78 km^{2}) is water.

== Demographics ==
Historical population
Census	Pop.	Note	%±
1850	385		—
1860	1,281		232.7%
1870	1,576		23.0%
1880	1,336		−15.2%
1890	1,250		−6.4%
1900	1,507		20.6%
1910	1,360		−9.8%
1920	1,114		−18.1%
1930	1,160		4.1%
1940	1,222		5.3%
1950	1,106		−9.5%
1960	1,347		21.8%
1970	1,237		−8.2%
1980	1,217		−1.6%
1990	1,102		−9.4%
2000	1,000		−9.3%
2010	931		−6.9%
2020	825		−11.4%
U.S. Decennial Census

=== 2010 census ===
As of the census of 2010, there were 931 people, 403 households, and 257 families residing in the city. The population density was 596.8 inhabitants per square mile (230.4/km^{2}). There were 461 housing units at an average density of 295.5 per square mile (114.1/km^{2}). The racial makeup of the city was 86.6% White, 9.7% African American, 0.3% Native American, 0.1% Asian, 0.2% from other races, and 3.1% from two or more races. Hispanic or Latino of any race were 0.9% of the population.

There were 403 households, of which 31.3% had children under the age of 18 living with them, 45.7% were married couples living together, 13.6% had a female householder with no husband present, 4.5% had a male householder with no wife present, and 36.2% were non-families. 29.8% of all households were made up of individuals, and 11.4% had someone living alone who was 65 years of age or older. The average household size was 2.31 and the average family size was 2.84.

The median age in the city was 39.1 years. 24.3% of residents were under the age of 18; 7.1% were between the ages of 18 and 24; 24.1% were from 25 to 44; 29.2% were from 45 to 64; and 15.1% were 65 years of age or older. The gender makeup of the city was 48.2% male and 51.8% female.

=== 2000 census ===
As of the census of 2000, there were 1,000 people, 435 households, and 267 families residing in the city. The population density was 719.7 inhabitants per square mile (277.9/km^{2}). There were 512 housing units at an average density of 368.5 per square mile (142.3/km^{2}). The racial makeup of the city was 86.80% White, 11.10% African American, 0.30% Native American, 0.40% from other races, and 1.40% from two or more races. Hispanic or Latino of any race were 0.60% of the population.

There were 435 households, out of which 27.4% had children under the age of 18 living with them, 48.7% were married couples living together, 8.7% had a female householder with no husband present, and 38.6% were non-families. 32.0% of all households were made up of individuals, and 17.7% had someone living alone who was 65 years of age or older. The average household size was 2.30 and the average family size was 2.90.

In the city the population was spread out, with 24.5% under the age of 18, 7.9% from 18 to 24, 26.7% from 25 to 44, 23.8% from 45 to 64, and 17.1% who were 65 years of age or older. The median age was 38 years. For every 100 females, there were 87.6 males. For every 100 females age 18 and over, there were 85.5 males.

The median income for a household in the city was $30,938, and the median income for a family was $38,672. Males had a median income of $26,458 versus $20,897 for females. The per capita income for the city was $15,399. About 7.3% of families and 12.2% of the population were below the poverty line, including 17.3% of those under age 18 and 7.3% of those age 65 or over.

== Education ==
It is in the Lewis County C-1 School District.

La Grange has a public library, the La Grange Branch Library.

== Notable residents ==
- Ella Ewing, world's tallest woman (in her era), born in La Grange, 1872.
- Lee Frayer, auto racer, drove in first Indianapolis 500, born in La Grange
- Justin Jennings, NASCAR driver
