= Lewis County, Missouri =

County in Missouri, United States

- County
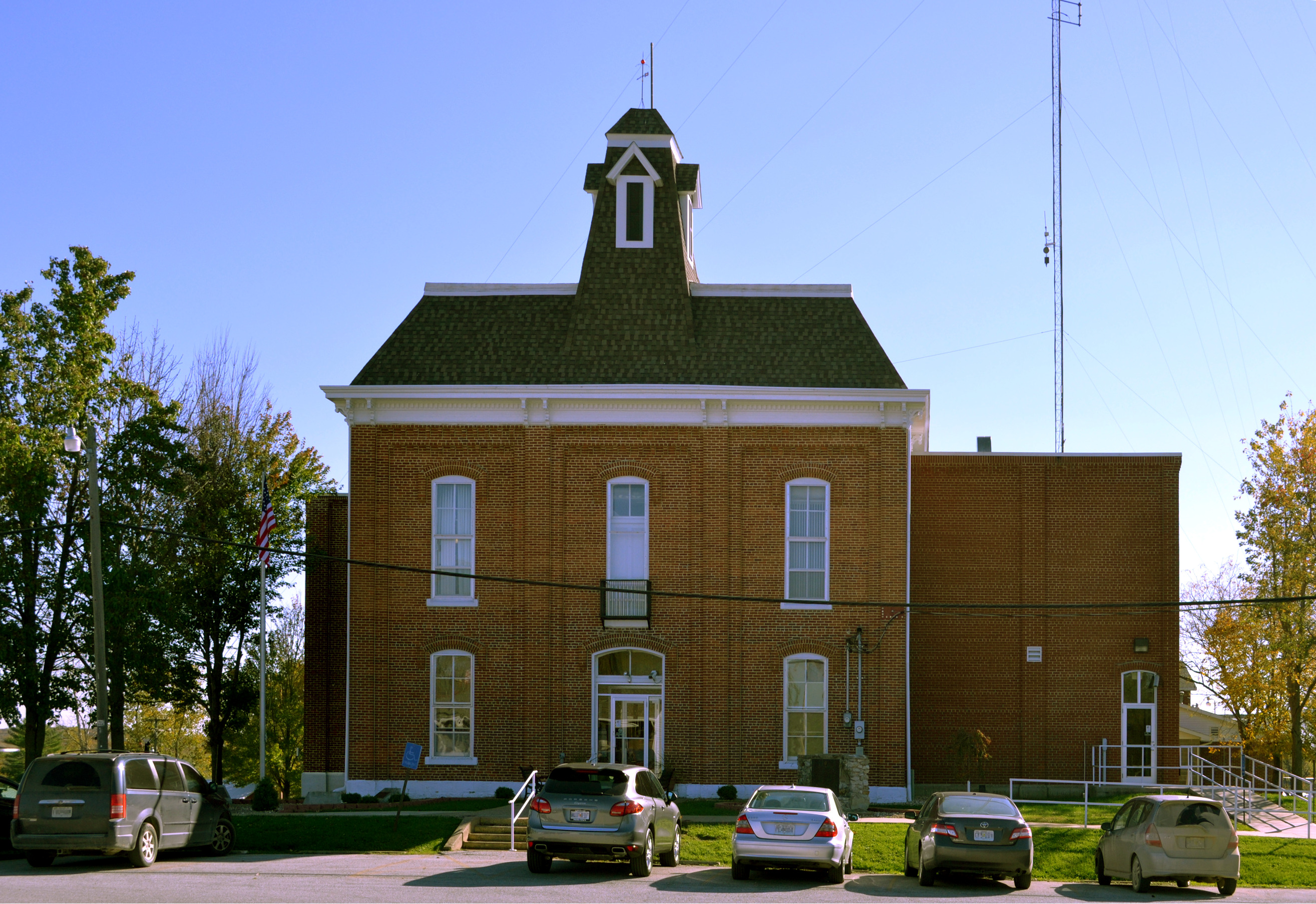
- Lewis County Courthouse in Monticello

- Location within the U.S. state of Missouri
- Coordinates: 40°05′N 91°44′W
- Country: United States
- State: Missouri
- Founded: January 2, 1833
- Named for: Meriwether Lewis
- Seat: Monticello
- Largest city: Canton

Area
  - Total: 511 sq mi (1,320 km^{2})
  - Land: 505 sq mi (1,310 km^{2})
  - Water: 5.8 sq mi (15 km^{2}) 1.1%

Population (2020)
  - Total: 10,032
  - Estimate (2025): 9,879 ▼
  - Density: 19.6/sq mi (7.6/km^{2})
- Time zone: UTC−6 (Central)
  - Summer (DST): UTC−5 (CDT)
- ZIP Codes: 63435, 63438, 63440, 63447, 63448, 63452, 63454, 63457, 63471
- Area code: 660, 573, 235
- Congressional district: 6th
- Website: lewiscountymo.org

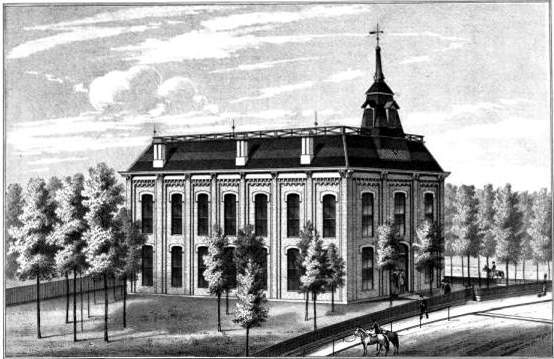
The Lewis County, Missouri courthouse in Monticello as it appeared in the mid-1870s.

Lewis County is a county located in the northeastern portion of the U.S. state of Missouri. As of the 2020 census, the population was 10,032. Its county seat is Monticello. The county was organized January 2, 1833, and named for Meriwether Lewis, the explorer and Governor of the Louisiana Territory.

Lewis County is part of the Quincy, IL–MO Micropolitan Statistical Area.

== History ==
=== Early history and founding ===
What is now Lewis County was once (like much of the Midwest) home to the Mound Builders, a general term for a group of Pre-Columbian peoples that established complex mound earthworks and existed roughly 2-3 millennia ago. The area eventually fell under control of the Missouria tribe. Lewis County was first scouted by Europeans in 1673, when a French expedition led by Father Jacques Marquette came across the region. Several French expeditions followed, and small numbers of settlers would occasionally settle in the area, though never permanently. The Missouria and European settlers were joined in the early 19th century by the Sauk people, with who they engaged in frequent skirmishes.

Following the acquisition of the Louisiana Territory, the area was calmed when the United States established a peace treaty with the Sauk. The Sauk, however, fought against the United States during the War of 1812, after which a series of treaties were established, culminating in a final treaty in 1824 where the Native Americans of the area renounced their territorial claims. Following several failed attempts at settlement, the town of La Grange was founded in 1832.

During the early 19th century, Lewis County was part of the District of St. Charles. After several county reorganizations, Lewis County was established in 1833 from Marion County and named after Meriwether Lewis of the Lewis and Clark Expedition. The county was largely settled by farmers from Virginia and Kentucky. They brought slaves and were attracted to the fertile land and easy river transportation. The economy was based on subsistence agriculture, timber harvesting, and lead mining. In 1845, Knox County was split off, leaving Lewis County with its present boundaries. The county continued to prosper through the 1850s, with hemp emerging as the main crop. A major flood came through in 1851, destroying the once significant town of Tully, but the county continued to prosper into the 1860s.

=== Civil War and 19th century ===
Following the election of Abraham Lincoln, the county became split between secessionists and unionists. Despite significant disputes, unionism was more popular in the county, and 500 men were raised for the Union Army during the American Civil War. Secessionists remained popular, however, and the county was split for much of the war between Unionists at La Grange and Secessionists at Canton, although the county was spared from open conflict aside from occasional partisan attacks and skirmishes.

After the Civil War, the slaves were emancipated and the county's economy shifted towards commercial agriculture, with the production of corn, wheat and timber that were shipped through Canton, a port on the Mississippi River. Having emerged from the war mostly unscathed, Lewis County continued to prosper even after emancipation. The Chicago and North Western Railway arrived in 1869, leading to even greater prosperity for the county.

Mark Twain lived in the county briefly and was inspired by the natural beauty of the river region for his writing.

=== Modern history ===
Today, Lewis County is all rural, with a few small towns under 2500 population, and Canton at 2800. The economy is built on soybeans, corn and timber, as well as higher education. Canton is the home of Culver–Stockton College. The National Register of Historic Places celebrates 12 historic locations in the county.

== Geography ==
According to the U.S. Census Bureau, the county has a total area of 511 square miles (1,320 km^{2}), of which 505 square miles (1,310 km^{2}) is land and 5.8 square miles (15 km^{2}) (1.1%) is water.

=== Adjacent counties ===
- Clark County (north)
- Hancock County, Illinois (northeast)
- Adams County, Illinois (southeast)
- Marion County (south)
- Shelby County (southwest)
- Knox County (west)

== Demographics ==
Historical population
Census	Pop.	Note	%±
1840	6,040		—
1850	6,578		8.9%
1860	12,286		86.8%
1870	15,114		23.0%
1880	15,925		5.4%
1890	15,935		0.1%
1900	16,724		5.0%
1910	15,514		−7.2%
1920	13,465		−13.2%
1930	12,093		−10.2%
1940	11,490		−5.0%
1950	10,733		−6.6%
1960	10,984		2.3%
1970	10,993		0.1%
1980	10,901		−0.8%
1990	10,233		−6.1%
2000	10,494		2.6%
2010	10,211		−2.7%
2020	10,032		−1.8%
2025 (est.)	9,879	▼	−1.5%
U.S. Decennial Census; 1790-1960 1900-90; 1990-2000 2010 2025

=== 2020 census ===
As of the 2020 census, the county had a population of 10,032 and a median age of 39.3 years; 21.2% of residents were under the age of 18 and 19.1% were 65 years of age or older. For every 100 females there were 101.3 males, and there were 98.5 males for every 100 females age 18 and over.

The racial makeup of the county was 93.3% White, 1.8% Black or African American, 0.3% American Indian and Alaska Native, 0.2% Asian, 0.0% Native Hawaiian and Pacific Islander, 0.9% from some other race, and 3.4% from two or more races. Hispanic or Latino residents of any race comprised 1.6% of the population.

There were 3,789 households in the county, of which 28.3% had children under the age of 18 living with them and 23.3% had a female householder with no spouse or partner present. About 30.5% of all households were made up of individuals and 14.3% had someone living alone who was 65 years of age or older.

There were 4,312 housing units, of which 12.1% were vacant. Among occupied housing units, 73.3% were owner-occupied and 26.7% were renter-occupied. The homeowner vacancy rate was 1.3% and the rental vacancy rate was 10.4%.

0.0% of residents lived in urban areas, while 100.0% lived in rural areas.

=== 2010 census ===
As of the 2010 census, there were 10,211 people, 3,956 households, and 2,709 families residing in the county. The population density was 21 people per square mile. The racial makeup of the county was 95.92% White, 2.53% Black or African American, 0.16% Native American, 0.20% Asian, 0.02% Pacific Islander, 0.44% from other races, and 0.73% from two or more races. Approximately 0.73% of the population were Hispanic or Latino of any race. 34.9% were of German, 18.3% American, 11.2% English and 10.8% Irish ancestry.

The average household size was 2.46 and the average family size was 3.00. In the county, the population was spread out, with 25.00% under the age of 18, 12.90% from 18 to 24, 24.60% from 25 to 44, 21.40% from 45 to 64, and 16.10% who were 65 years of age or older. Females comprised 51% of the population. The median age was 36 years.

Median income for a household in the county was $30,651, and the median income for a family was $35,740. Males had a median income of $27,778 versus $19,679 for females. The per capita income for the county was $14,746. 16.10% of the population and 10.70% of families were below the poverty line.

=== Racial and ethnic composition ===
Lewis County, Missouri – Racial and ethnic composition Note: the US Census treats Hispanic/Latino as an ethnic category. This table excludes Latinos from the racial categories and assigns them to a separate category. Hispanics/Latinos may be of any race.
Race / Ethnicity (NH = Non-Hispanic)	Pop 1980	Pop 1990	Pop 2000	Pop 2010	Pop 2020	% 1980	% 1990	% 2000	% 2010	% 2020
White alone (NH)	10,480	9,823	10,032	9,546	9,315	96.14%	95.99%	95.60%	93.49%	92.85%
Black or African American alone (NH)	356	342	264	321	185	3.27%	3.34%	2.52%	3.14%	1.84%
Native American or Alaska Native alone (NH)	4	19	16	25	30	0.04%	0.19%	0.15%	0.24%	0.30%
Asian alone (NH)	20	16	21	22	22	0.18%	0.16%	0.20%	0.22%	0.22%
Native Hawaiian or Pacific Islander alone (NH)	x	x	2	7	0	x	x	0.02%	0.07%	0.00%
Other race alone (NH)	5	7	6	3	10	0.05%	0.07%	0.06%	0.03%	0.10%
Mixed race or Multiracial (NH)	x	x	76	128	305	x	x	0.72%	1.25%	3.04%
Hispanic or Latino (any race)	36	26	77	159	165	0.33%	0.25%	0.73%	1.56%	1.64%
Total	10,901	10,233	10,494	10,211	10,032	100.00%	100.00%	100.00%	100.00%	

== Economy ==
Today's Lewis County has a small but relatively diversified economy based primarily on agriculture, government services, and higher education. Despite low unemployment rates, Lewis County, like many rural counties, suffers from a rapidly aging population. A sizable number of residents commute to larger job centers in neighboring Marion County and Quincy, Illinois.

Largest industries by employment (>100 people)
Sector	Employment numbers
Government	550
Retail	380
Agriculture	340
Healthcare and Social Services	315
Construction	210
Arts, Entertainment, and Recreation	190
Manufacturing	190
Education	185
Logistics	170
Accommodation and Food Services	145
Finance	115
Other	100

== Media ==
=== Media ===
==== Newspapers ====
- The Press-News Journal is the county's newspaper of record, and has been published in Canton since 1862.
- The Lewis County Scoop is an online county paper.

== Government and politics ==
Lewis County, Missouri

Elected countywide officials
Assessor	Tammy Logsdon	Republican
Circuit Clerk	Julie George	Republican
County Clerk	Shannon Sapp	Republican
Collector	Lindsey Lay	Republican
Commissioner (presiding)	Wayne Murphy, Jr.	Republican
Commissioner (district 1)	Deanne Whiston	Republican
Commissioner (district 2)	Travis Fleer	Republican
Coroner	Larry Arnold	Democratic
Prosecuting Attorney	Chelsea L. Fellinger	Republican
Public Administrator	Luke Barton	Republican
Recorder	Amy Parrish	Democratic
Sheriff	David T. Parrish	Democratic
Surveyor	Carson W. Lay	Republican
Treasurer	Bonnie Roberson	Republican

=== Government ===
Lewis County is represented in the United States Senate by Josh Hawley and Eric Schmitt, both Republicans. It is represented in the United States House of Representatives as part of Missouri's 6th congressional district by Republican Sam Graves. At the state level, Lewis County is part of Missouri's 18th Senate district, represented by Republican Cindy O'Laughlin, and Missouri's 4th House of Representatives district, represented by Republican Greg Sharpe. Locally, the county has a three-member board of commissioners and several elected county officials. Judicially, the county is in the Missouri Court of Appeals' Eastern District and the state's 2nd Judicial Circuit Court, presided over by Republican Matthew Wilson.

United States presidential election results for Lewis County, Missouri
Year	Republican		Democratic		Third party(ies)	
Year	No.	%	No.	%	No.	%
1888	1,412	38.13%	2,268	61.25%	23	0.62%
1892	1,322	35.49%	2,220	59.60%	183	4.91%
1896	1,581	37.28%	2,624	61.87%	36	0.85%
1900	1,442	35.07%	2,583	62.82%	87	2.12%
1904	1,467	39.08%	2,202	58.66%	85	2.26%
1908	1,473	36.89%	2,439	61.08%	81	2.03%
1912	1,004	26.72%	2,340	62.27%	414	11.02%
1916	1,429	37.28%	2,357	61.49%	47	1.23%
1920	2,810	43.87%	3,542	55.30%	53	0.83%
1924	2,416	39.48%	3,481	56.88%	223	3.64%
1928	2,741	48.55%	2,882	51.04%	23	0.41%
1932	1,341	26.07%	3,746	72.84%	56	1.09%
1936	1,994	33.78%	3,859	65.37%	50	0.85%
1940	2,428	40.86%	3,484	58.63%	30	0.50%
1944	1,988	40.72%	2,883	59.05%	11	0.23%
1948	1,564	33.06%	3,155	66.69%	12	0.25%
1952	2,416	45.41%	2,896	54.44%	8	0.15%
1956	2,301	45.75%	2,728	54.25%	0	0.00%
1960	2,560	48.43%	2,726	51.57%	0	0.00%
1964	1,239	27.41%	3,281	72.59%	0	0.00%
1968	2,038	43.90%	2,067	44.53%	537	11.57%
1972	2,738	61.76%	1,695	38.24%	0	0.00%
1976	1,983	44.10%	2,486	55.28%	28	0.62%
1980	2,350	49.07%	2,314	48.32%	125	2.61%
1984	2,438	55.22%	1,977	44.78%	0	0.00%
1988	1,803	42.20%	2,460	57.57%	10	0.23%
1992	1,461	32.03%	2,196	48.14%	905	19.84%
1996	1,453	34.79%	2,050	49.09%	673	16.12%
2000	2,388	53.26%	2,023	45.12%	73	1.63%
2004	2,862	61.63%	1,754	37.77%	28	0.60%
2008	2,594	57.62%	1,837	40.80%	71	1.58%
2012	2,677	62.56%	1,508	35.24%	94	2.20%
2016	3,344	74.64%	934	20.85%	202	4.51%
2020	3,553	77.09%	984	21.35%	72	1.56%
2024	3,565	79.47%	872	19.44%	49	1.09%

=== Politics ===
In its early history, Lewis County stood out from much of northeast Missouri by supporting Democrats, while neighboring counties tended to be Whig strongholds. This support for Democrats was never exceptionally strong, and in 1860 Lewis County joined its neighbors in voting for the moderate, anti-secessionist Constitutional Union Party, then for Lincoln and Ulysses S. Grant. In 1872, however, Lewis was caught up in a major Northeastern swing towards Democrats, and it along with the rest of the region remained loyally Democratic until the late 20th century, with its large agricultural and labor base supporting New Deal policies. Even as the county was occasionally won in Republican landslide elections such as Richard Nixon and Ronald Reagan's victories, Republicans never managed to pull away and the county continued to shift between voting for Republican and Democratic presidents. Even during Republican landslides, the county continued to vote for Democratic legislators due to the relative conservatism of regional Democrats, who were pro-unions and opposed issues unpopular amongst moderate Democrats such as gun control and NAFTA. The Democratic Party's support for civil rights in the 1960s led to a backlash that shifted voters to the Republican Party as Missouri became a Republican stronghold in the 1970s. In 2024 Democrats failed to break even 20% for the first time in county history, and today Lewis County is dominated by Republicans at every level except for a handful of Democrats at the local level.

== Transportation ==
=== Major highways ===
- U.S. Route 61
- Route 6
- Route 16
- Route 81
- Route 156

=== Transit ===
- Burlington Trailways
- OATS Transit

=== Railroads ===
- BNSF Railway (commercial)

== Education ==
Five school districts cover sections of the county: Canton R-V School District, Lewis County C-1 School District, Clark County R-1 School District, Knox County R-I School District, and Palmyra R-I School District.

=== Public schools ===
Two school districts operate schools in the county boundaries:

- Canton R-V School District – Canton
  - Canton Elementary School (PK-06)
  - Canton High School (07-12)
- Lewis County C-1 School District – Ewing
  - Highland Elementary School (K-06)
  - Highland Junior-Senior High School (07-12)

=== Private schools ===
- Cedar Falls School – Canton (K-12) – Nonsectarian

=== Post-secondary ===
- Culver-Stockton College – Canton – A private, four-year Christian Church (Disciples of Christ) university.

=== Public libraries ===
- Canton Public Library
- Labelle Branch Library
- Lagrange Branch Library

== Communities ==
=== Cities and towns ===
- Canton
- Ewing
- La Belle
- La Grange
- Lewistown
- Monticello (county seat)

=== Census-designated place ===
- Williamstown

=== Unincorporated communities ===
- Argola
- Benjamin
- Deer Ridge
- Derrahs
- Dover
- Durgen
- Durham
- Gilead
- Laura
- Maywood
- Midway
- Salem
- Santuzza
- Sellers
- Steffenville
- Ten Mile
- Tolona
- Weber

== See also ==
- National Register of Historic Places listings in Lewis County, Missouri
