= Quincy–Hannibal combined statistical area =

Coordinates: 39°56′N 91°23′W

Quincy, IL Quincy, Illinois Micropolitan Statistical Area
- Micropolitan Statistical Area
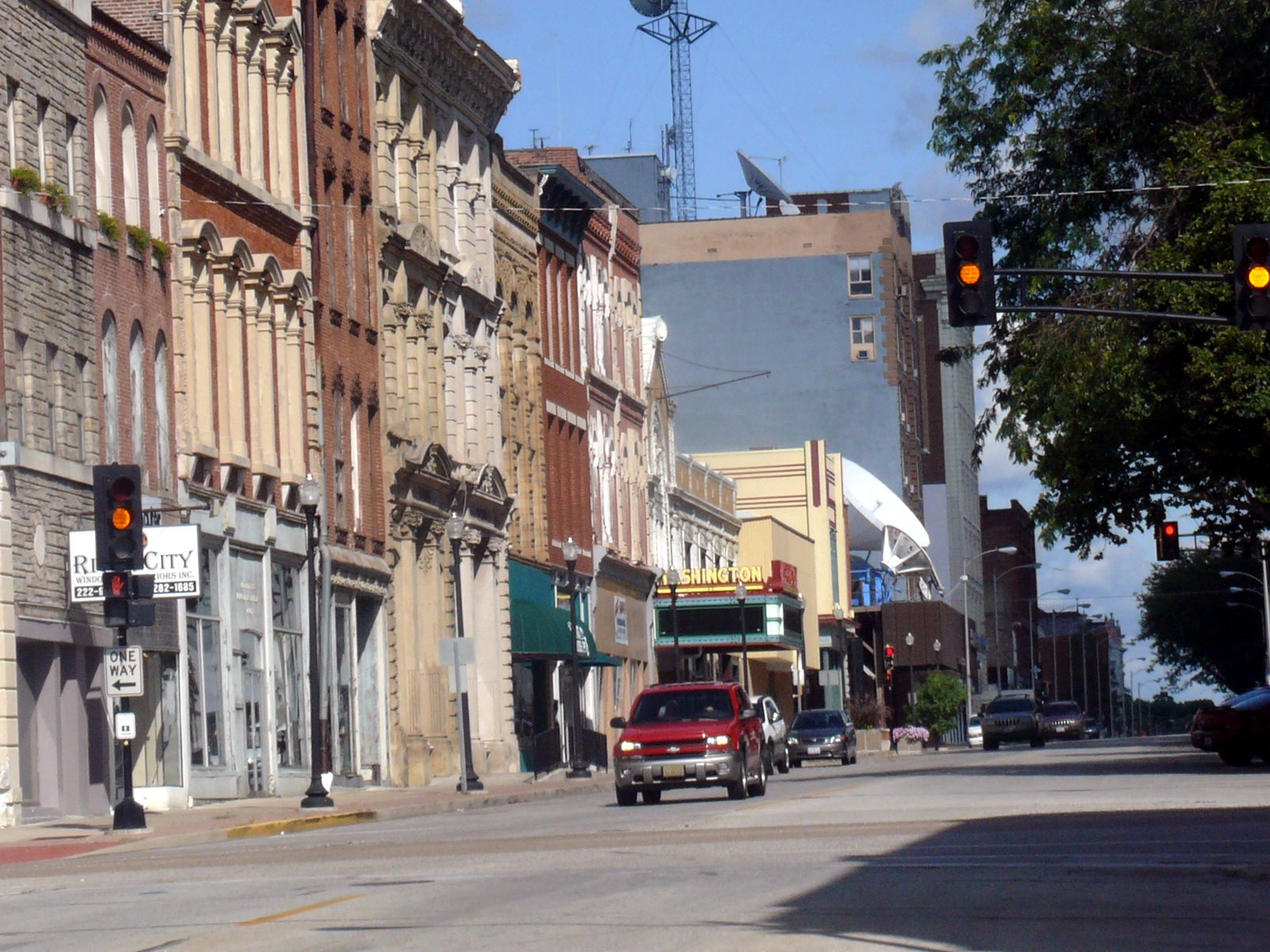
- Downtown Quincy
Map of Quincy–Hannibal, IL–MO CSA
City of Quincy, IL
Quincy, IL µSA
City of Hannibal, MO
Hannibal, MO µSA
Pike County, IL
- Country: United States
- State: Illinois; Missouri
- Largest city: Quincy, Illinois

Population (2020)
  - Total: 114,649
- Time zone: UTC−6 (CST)
  - Summer (DST): UTC−5 (CDT)

The Quincy–Hannibal, IL–MO Combined Statistical Area, as defined by the United States Census Bureau, is an area consisting of one county in Western Illinois and three counties in northeast Missouri, anchored by the cities of Quincy and Hannibal.

As of the 2020 census, the μSA had a population of 114,649.

== Counties ==
In Illinois

- Adams

In Missouri

- Lewis
- Marion
- Ralls

== Communities ==
All populations are based on the 2012 census.

=== Anchor Cities ===
- Quincy Pop: 40,798
- Hannibal Pop: 17,814

=== Places with 1,000 to 5,000 inhabitants ===
- Vandalia (partial) Pop: 4,017 (~2,000 are inmates at a local prison)
- Palmyra Pop: 3,610
- Monroe City (partial) Pop: 2,485
- Canton Pop: 2,376
- Camp Point Pop: 1,129
- Payson Pop: 1,020

=== Places with 500 to 1,000 inhabitants ===
- New London Pop: 981
- Mendon Pop: 948
- La Grange Pop: 931
- Clayton Pop: 704
- Perry Pop: 702
- La Belle Pop: 656
- Golden Pop: 641
- Ursa Pop: 626
- Lewistown Pop: 530
- Liberty Pop: 516
- Center Pop: 512

=== Places with less than 500 inhabitants ===
- Ewing Pop: 452
- Loraine Pop: 313
- Plainville Pop: 264
- Rennselaer Pop: 231
- Lima Pop: 163
- Coatsburg Pop: 147
- Columbus Pop: 99
- Monticello Pop: 98
- La Prairie Pop: 47

=== Unincorporated places ===
- Beverly
- Bigneck also spelled Big Neck
- Burton
- Durham
- Fall Creek
- Fowler
- Kellerville
- Kingston
- Marblehead
- Marcelline
- Maywood
- Meyer
- North Quincy
- Paloma
- Philadelphia
- Richfield
- Steffenville
- Taylor
- West Quincy
- Williamstown

== Demographics ==
As of the census of 2000, there were 78,771 people, 30,816 households, and 20,705 families residing within the μSA. The racial makeup of the μSA was 95.21% White, 3.00% African American, 0.16% Native American, 0.37% Asian, 0.01% Pacific Islander, 0.33% from other races, and 0.92% from two or more races. Hispanic or Latino of any race were 0.82% of the population.

The median income for a household in the μSA was $32,718, and the median income for a family was $39,937. Males had a median income of $29,475 versus $20,381 for females. The per capita income for the μSA was $16,320.

In 2015 Quincy, Illinois was named as a finalist for the All-American City.

== Education ==
Quincy, IL is home to institutions of higher education including John Wood Community College, and Quincy University.

== Transportation ==
Quincy Transit Lines serves the Quincy area. The Carl Sandburg and Illinois Zephyr Amtrak trains serve Quincy station.

== See also ==
- Illinois statistical areas
- Hannibal, Missouri micropolitan area
- Greater St. Louis
