= Honey Creek Township, Adams County, Illinois =

Township in Illinois, US

Honey Creek Township
- Township
- Location in Adams County

- Adams County's location in Illinois
- Coordinates: 40°03′44″N 91°12′11″W
- Country: United States
- State: Illinois
- County: Adams
- Established: November 6, 1849

Area
  - Total: 36.66 sq mi (94.9 km^{2})
  - Land: 36.58 sq mi (94.7 km^{2})
  - Water: 0.08 sq mi (0.21 km^{2}) 0.22%
- Elevation: 690 ft (210 m)

Population (2020)
  - Total: 747
  - Density: 20.4/sq mi (7.88/km^{2})
- Time zone: UTC-6 (CST)
  - Summer (DST): UTC-5 (CDT)
- ZIP codes: 62320, 62325, 62351, 62359
- FIPS code: 17-001-35957

Honey Creek Township is one of twenty-two townships in Adams County, Illinois, United States. As of the 2020 census, its population was 747 and it contained 312 housing units.

== Geography ==
According to the 2010 census, the township has a total area of 36.66 square miles (94.9 km^{2}), of which 36.58 square miles (94.7 km^{2}) (or 99.78%) is land and 0.08 square miles (0.21 km^{2}) (or 0.22%) is water.

=== Cities ===
- Coatsburg

=== Unincorporated towns ===
- Paloma

=== Cemeteries ===
The township contains five cemeteries: Byler, Cate Family, Gooding, Gray Mound and Laugh.

=== Major highways ===
- US Route 24
- Illinois State Route 61

== Demographics ==
As of the 2020 census there were 747 people, 291 households, and 226 families residing in the township. The population density was 20.35 inhabitants per square mile (7.86/km^{2}). There were 312 housing units at an average density of 8.50 units per square mile (3.28 units/km^{2}). The racial makeup of the township was 94.78% White, 0.27% African American, 0.00% Native American, 0.13% Asian, 0.00% Pacific Islander, 1.34% from other races, and 3.48% from two or more races. Hispanic or Latino of any race were 1.74% of the population.

There were 291 households, out of which 34.00% had children under the age of 18 living with them, 66.32% were married couples living together, 9.62% had a female householder with no spouse present, and 22.34% were non-families. 13.70% of all households were made up of individuals, and 8.20% had someone living alone who was 65 years of age or older. The average household size was 2.70 and the average family size was 3.05.

The township's age distribution consisted of 20.2% under the age of 18, 11.1% from 18 to 24, 26.8% from 25 to 44, 24.9% from 45 to 64, and 16.9% who were 65 years of age or older. The median age was 39.4 years. For every 100 females, there were 114.2 males. For every 100 females age 18 and over, there were 103.6 males.

The median income for a household in the township was $78,906, and the median income for a family was $83,750. Males had a median income of $42,576 versus $26,648 for females. The per capita income for the township was $28,891. No families and 0.8% of the population were below the poverty line, including none of those under age 18 and 1.5% of those age 65 or over.

Historical population
Census	Pop.	Note	%±
2010	720		—
2020	747		3.8%
U.S. Decennial Census

== School districts ==
- Central Community Unit School District 3
- Griggsville-Perry Community Unit School District 4

== Political districts ==
- Illinois' 18th congressional district
- State House District 93
- State Senate District 47
