= Gilmer Township, Illinois =

Township in Illinois, US

Gilmer Township
- Township
- Location in Adams County

- Adams County's location in Illinois
- Coordinates: 39°58′29″N 91°12′22″W
- Country: United States
- State: Illinois
- County: Adams
- Established: November 6, 1849

Area
  - Total: 37.12 sq mi (96.1 km^{2})
  - Land: 37.06 sq mi (96.0 km^{2})
  - Water: 0.07 sq mi (0.18 km^{2}) 0.19%
- Elevation: 696 ft (212 m)

Population (2020)
  - Total: 1,168
  - Density: 31.52/sq mi (12.17/km^{2})
- Time zone: UTC-6 (CST)
  - Summer (DST): UTC-5 (CDT)
- ZIP codes: 62301, 62320, 62325, 62338, 62347, 62359
- FIPS code: 17-001-29288

Gilmer Township is one of twenty-two townships in Adams County, Illinois, United States. As of the 2020 census, its population was 1,168 and it contained 476 housing units.

== Geography ==
According to the 2010 census, the township has a total area of 37.12 square miles (96.1 km^{2}), of which 37.06 square miles (96.0 km^{2}) (or 99.84%) is land and 0.07 square miles (0.18 km^{2}) (or 0.19%) is water.

=== Cities ===
- Columbus (west quarter)

=== Unincorporated towns ===
- Fowler

=== Cemeteries ===
The township contains five cemeteries: Evergreen, Mount Pleasant, Paloma, Saint Joseph and Stahl.

=== Major highways ===
- US Route 24
- Illinois State Route 104

=== Airports and landing strips ===
- Quincy Regional Airport

== Demographics ==
As of the 2020 census there were 1,168 people, 385 households, and 303 families residing in the township. The population density was 31.48 inhabitants per square mile (12.15/km^{2}). There were 476 housing units at an average density of 12.83 units per square mile (4.95 units/km^{2}). The racial makeup of the township was 93.58% White, 1.11% African American, 0.26% Native American, 0.34% Asian, 0.00% Pacific Islander, 0.60% from other races, and 4.11% from two or more races. Hispanic or Latino of any race were 1.88% of the population.

There were 385 households, out of which 40.30% had children under the age of 18 living with them, 70.65% were married couples living together, 2.34% had a female householder with no spouse present, and 21.30% were non-families. 21.30% of all households were made up of individuals, and 16.90% had someone living alone who was 65 years of age or older. The average household size was 2.72 and the average family size was 3.08.

The township's age distribution consisted of 27.1% under the age of 18, 7.1% from 18 to 24, 22.3% from 25 to 44, 25.3% from 45 to 64, and 18.2% who were 65 years of age or older. The median age was 40.0 years. For every 100 females, there were 116.3 males. For every 100 females age 18 and over, there were 111.9 males.

The median income for a household in the township was $64,222, and the median income for a family was $73,079. Males had a median income of $58,375 versus $35,417 for females. The per capita income for the township was $29,607. About 10.9% of families and 8.8% of the population were below the poverty line, including 8.9% of those under age 18 and 15.7% of those age 65 or over.

Historical population
| Census | Pop. | Note | %± |
|---|---|---|---|
| 2010 | 1,128 | | — |
| 2020 | 1,168 | | 3.5% |
U.S. Decennial Census

== School districts ==
- Central Community Unit School District 3
- Griggsville-Perry Community Unit School District 4
- Liberty Community Unit School District 2

== Political districts ==
- Illinois' 15th congressional district
- State House District 99
- State Senate District 50
