= Paloma, Illinois =

Paloma
- Unincorporated community
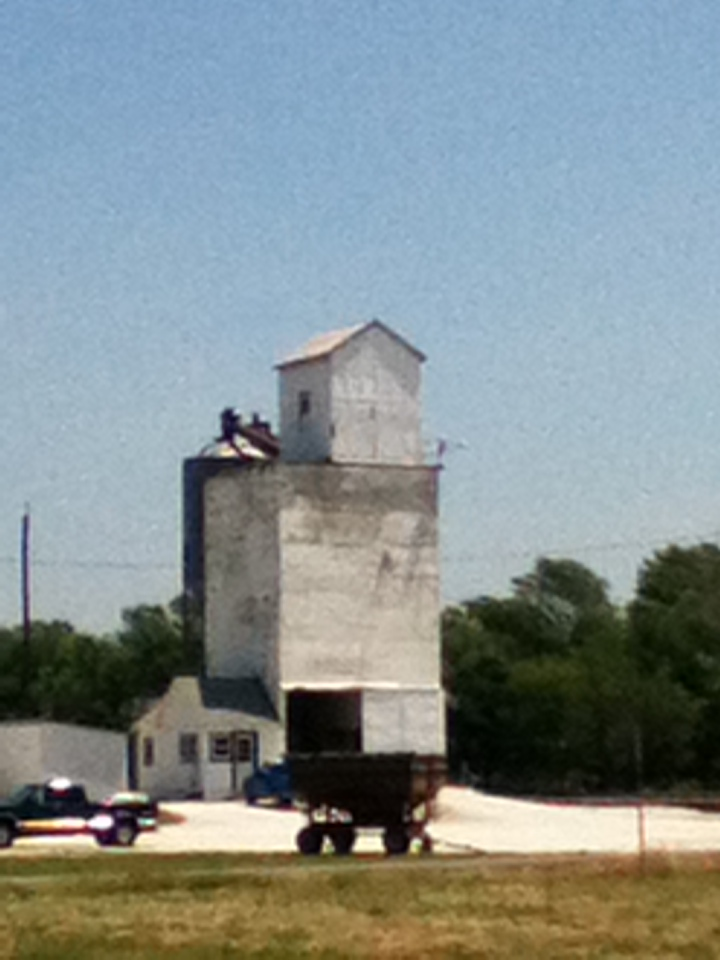
- The Grain Elevator in Paloma

- Location of Paloma within Illinois Paloma (the United States)
- Coordinates: 40°01′25″N 91°11′55″W
- Country: United States
- State: Illinois
- County: Adams
- Elevation: 735 ft (224 m)
- Time zone: UTC-6 (CST)
  - Summer (DST): UTC-5 (CDT)
- ZIP code: 62359
- Area code: 217
- GNIS feature ID: 2804089

Paloma, Illinois is an unincorporated community in Honey Creek Township, Adams County, Illinois, United States. As of the 2020 census, Paloma had a population of 114. Its main auxiliary route is U.S. Route 24 and is within two miles of Coatsburg, another rural community. During the early 1900s the village was famous for its pickle production and was often nicknamed "Pickleville" because of the vast pickle farms.

Paloma is part of the Quincy, IL–MO Micropolitan Statistical Area.

== History ==
The community was once known as Pickleville. Local producers shipped pickles to Quincy off a rail platform about a mile west of the present Paloma. Paloma was founded in 1839 when Gooding settled here and the cemetery started. Daniel Gooding, an early settler, offered to build the railroad a depot and platform if it would move the Pickleville platform to the town he platted on his land. The railroad agreed, Gooding built the depot and a railroad conductor's wife was responsible for changing the name of the community. Deciding Pickleville wasn't very fitting, she named it after a small tribe of Indians, the Paloma, a term which is also Spanish for dove.

The community thrived thanks to the railroad. At one point, the town had two gas stations, a general store, bank, lumberyard, an elevator, a bulk plant and busy Saturday nights when farmers came into town to trade for their groceries. Euterpe Hall, named for a Greek muse, was the site of plays and shows in the late 19th and early 20th centuries, eventually moving to nearby Fowler and then closing. U.S. Route 24 came through in 1923-24, signaling the rise of the importance of the automobile and the decline of Paloma.

The elevator located in the center of the town once served the many pickles produced and still serves the home of local crops. Today even though pickles are no longer grown, the elevator remains a county landmark.

A sesquicentennial celebration took place August 24–26, 2007, in Paloma, with events tied to the 50th annual Paloma Fiesta.

== Geography ==
According to the United States Census Bureau, the ZIP Code Tabulation Area (ZCTA) 62359 includes and surrounds the community.

== Demographics ==
Paloma first appeared as a census designated place in the 2020 U.S. census.

For the 62359 ZCTA in the 2000 census, which includes Paloma, there were 192 people, 76 households, and 63 families residing in the area.
