= Anna Kay Scott =

American medical missionary

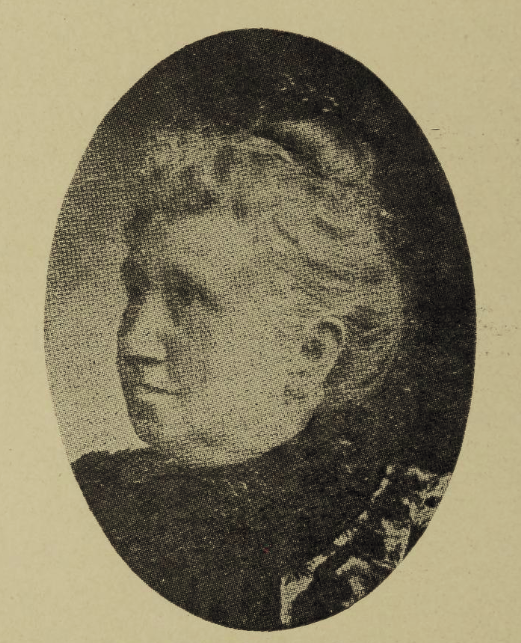
- Born: Mildred Anne Hasseltine Judson Kay; April 20, 1838; Payson, Illinois
- Died: October 18, 1923 (aged 85); Granville, Ohio
- Other name: Mildred Marston (pseudonym)
- Occupations: Physician, medical missionary, writer

Anna Kay Scott (April 20, 1838 – October 18, 1923), born Mildred Anne Hasseltine Judson Kay, was an American medical missionary in India and China.

== Early life ==
Mildred Ann Hasseltine Judson Kay was born in Payson, Illinois, the seventh of eleven children born to Robert Garnett and Cynthia Mills Kay. Her parents were from Virginia, and her father was a slaveowner. She graduated from Phipps Union Seminary in Albion, New York, and took courses at Quincy College.

== Career ==
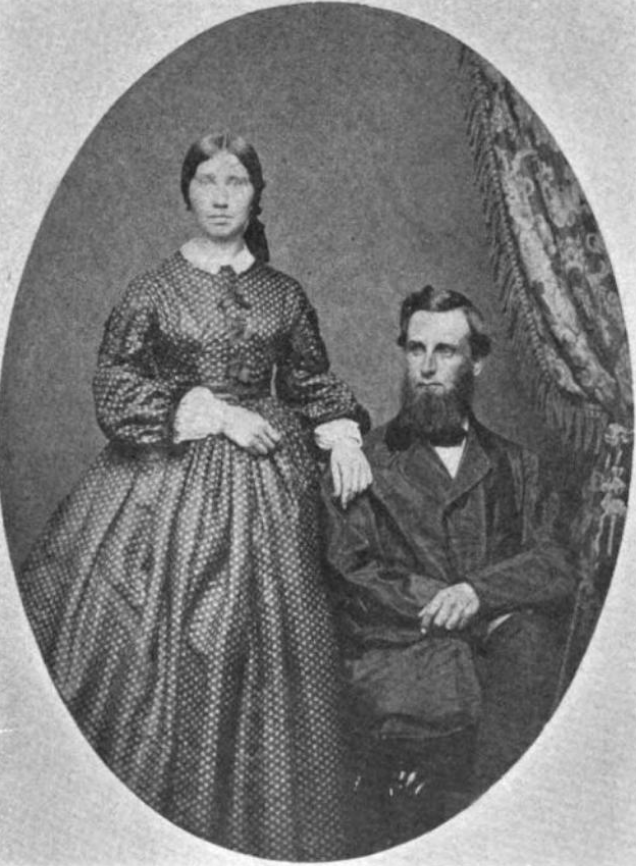
Anna Kay Scott and Rev. E. P. Scott, about 1862

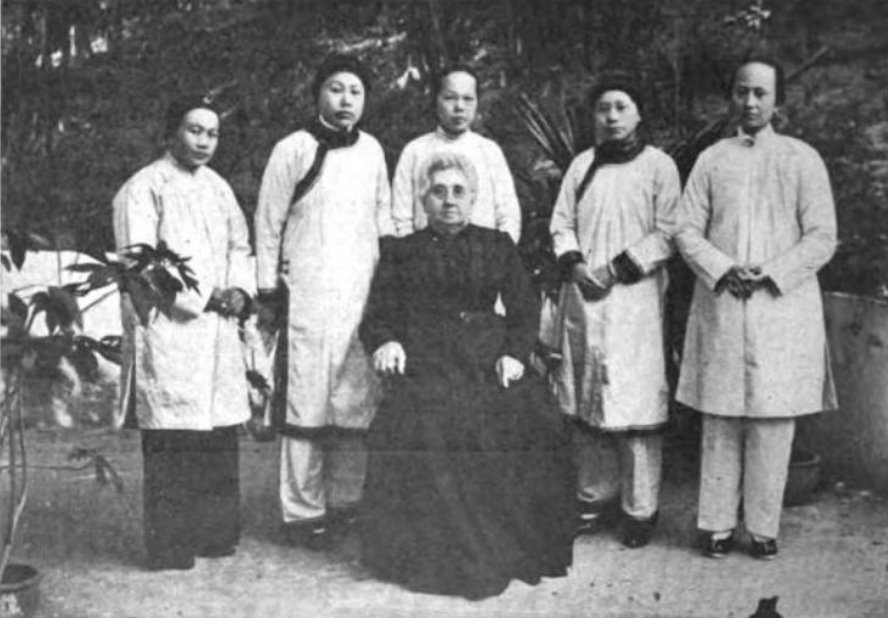
Anna Kay Scott with five Chinese nurses, from a 1912 publication.

Anna Kay taught school in Columbus, Illinois, as a young woman. She married a missionary in 1861, and the two left for a mission post in Nowgong in Assam the following year, arriving in the midst of a cholera epidemic. They spent a year learning Assamese, and worked among the Mikir (Karbi) people in the hills of Assam. She described the 1869 Cachar earthquake in her memoirs: "For two weeks there were tremors of the earth and I knew not if a more severe earthquake might come at any moment." Her husband experienced heat stroke and died from cholera in the months after the quake.

In widowhood, Scott continued mission work in India, working for the Woman's Baptist Missionary Society at Guwahati until 1873, when she returned to the United States with her three children. In 1878, she earned a medical degree in Cleveland, Ohio, and began a private practice in that city. In 1889, Scott went to Shantou in China, as a medical missionary with the American Baptist Foreign Mission Society. She expanded an infirmary into a hospital there, and evacuated to Kobe during the unrest of the Boxer Rebellion. She retired from mission work in 1914, replaced by her granddaughter, Dr. Mildred Scott.

Books by Scott include Korno Siga, the Mountain Chief, or Life in Assam (1889, using the pseudonym Mildred Marston), Gleanings from the Journal of a Medical Missionary, and An Autobiography of Anna Kay Scott, M.D. (1917).

== Personal life ==
Anna Kay married Edward Payson Scott in 1861. They had three children before Rev. Scott died in 1869. She died in 1923, at her daughter's home in Granville, Ohio, aged 85 years.
