= Richfield Township, Illinois =

Township in Illinois, US

Richfield Township
- Township
- Location in Adams County

- Adams County's location in Illinois
- Coordinates: 39°47′35″N 91°04′56″W
- Country: United States
- State: Illinois
- County: Adams
- Established: November 6, 1849

Area
  - Total: 38.03 sq mi (98.5 km^{2})
  - Land: 38.01 sq mi (98.4 km^{2})
  - Water: 0.02 sq mi (0.052 km^{2}) 0.05%
- Elevation: 663 ft (202 m)

Population (2020)
  - Total: 407
  - Density: 10.7/sq mi (4.13/km^{2})
- Time zone: UTC-6 (CST)
  - Summer (DST): UTC-5 (CDT)
- ZIP codes: 62312, 62347, 62365
- FIPS code: 17-001-63550

Richfield Township is one of twenty-two townships in Adams County, Illinois, United States. As of the 2010 census, its population was 411 and it contained 183 housing units.

== Geography ==
According to the 2010 census, the township has a total area of 38.03 square miles (98.5 km^{2}), of which 38.01 square miles (98.4 km^{2}) (or 99.95%) is land and 0.02 square miles (0.052 km^{2}) (or 0.05%) is water.

=== Unincorporated towns ===
- Kingston
- Richfield

=== Cemeteries ===
The township contains seven cemeteries: Baker Family, Franks, Klarner, Lock Family, Potter, Rice Family and Shiloh.

=== Major highways ===
- Illinois State Route 104

=== Airports and landing strips ===
- Dale A Klassing Airport

== Demographics ==
As of the 2020 census there were 407 people, 43 households, and 30 families residing in the township. The population density was 10.70 inhabitants per square mile (4.13/km^{2}). There were 171 housing units at an average density of 4.50 per square mile (1.74/km^{2}). The racial makeup of the township was 96.56% White, 0.00% African American, 0.25% Native American, 0.00% Asian, 0.00% Pacific Islander, 0.25% from other races, and 2.95% from two or more races. Hispanic or Latino of any race were 0.74% of the population.

There were 43 households, out of which 23.30% had children under the age of 18 living with them, 69.77% were married couples living together, 0.00% had a female householder with no spouse present, and 30.23% were non-families. 30.20% of all households were made up of individuals, and 0.00% had someone living alone who was 65 years of age or older. The average household size was 2.05 and the average family size was 2.50.

The township's age distribution consisted of 11.4% under the age of 18, none from 18 to 24, 21.6% from 25 to 44, 14.8% from 45 to 64, and 52.3% who were 65 years of age or older. The median age was 78.0 years. For every 100 females, there were 193.3 males. For every 100 females age 18 and over, there were 160.0 males.

The median income for a household in the township was $71,063 and the per capita income for the township was $35,788. None of the population was below the poverty line.

Historical population
Census	Pop.	Note	%±
2010	411		—
2020	407		−1.0%
U.S. Decennial Census

== School districts ==
- Barry Community Unit School District 1
- Liberty Community Unit School District 2
- Payson Community Unit School District 1

== Political districts ==
- Illinois' 18th congressional district
- State House District 93
- State Senate District 47
