= Wide Awakes =

1860s Republican youth organization

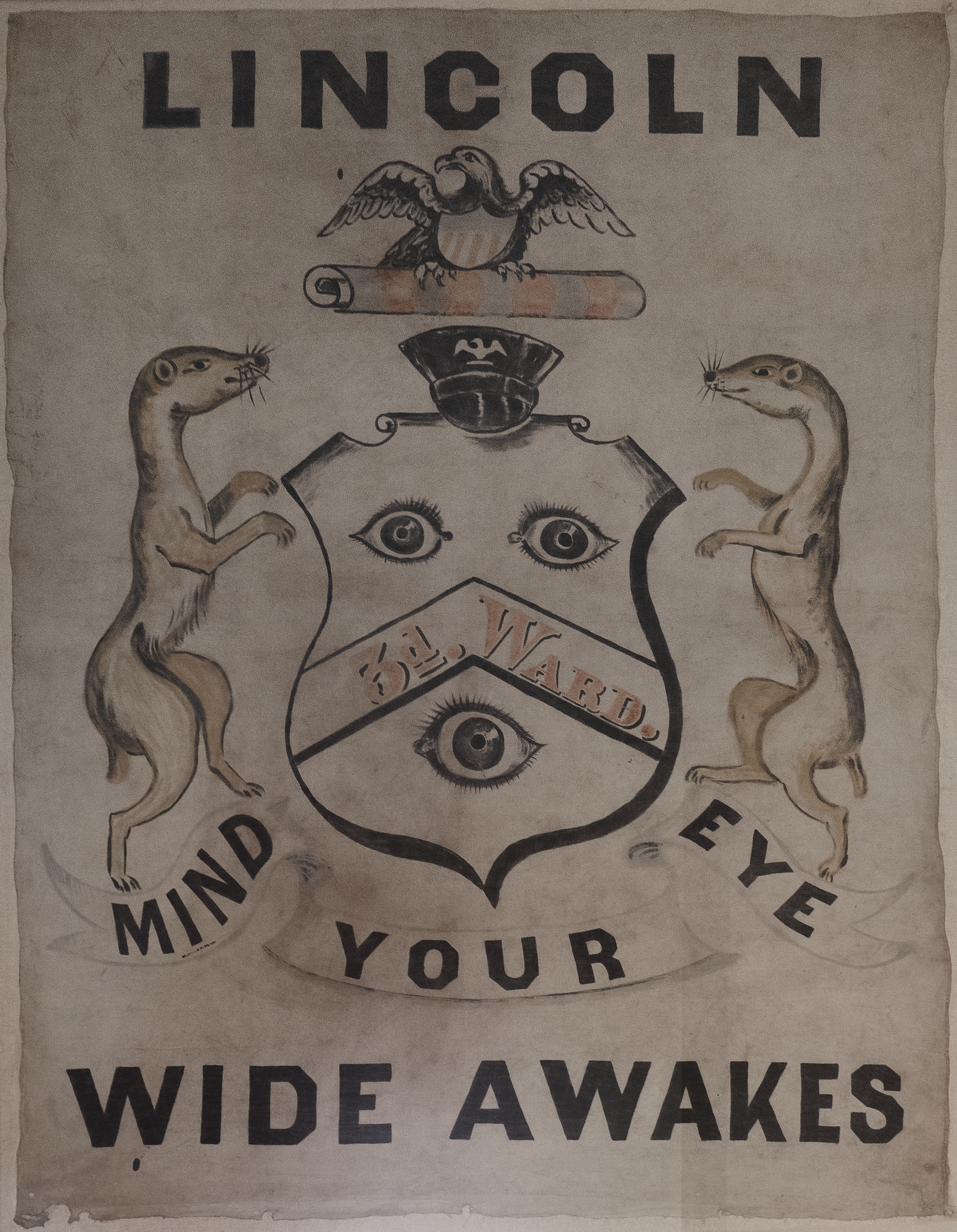
- Wide Awakes banner, on display at the Old Capitol building, Springfield, Illinois
- Founded: March 3, 1860 (officially)
- Dissolved: 1860
- Country: United States
- Allegiance: Republican Party
- Ideology: Anti-slavery
- Size: over 500,000 (est.)

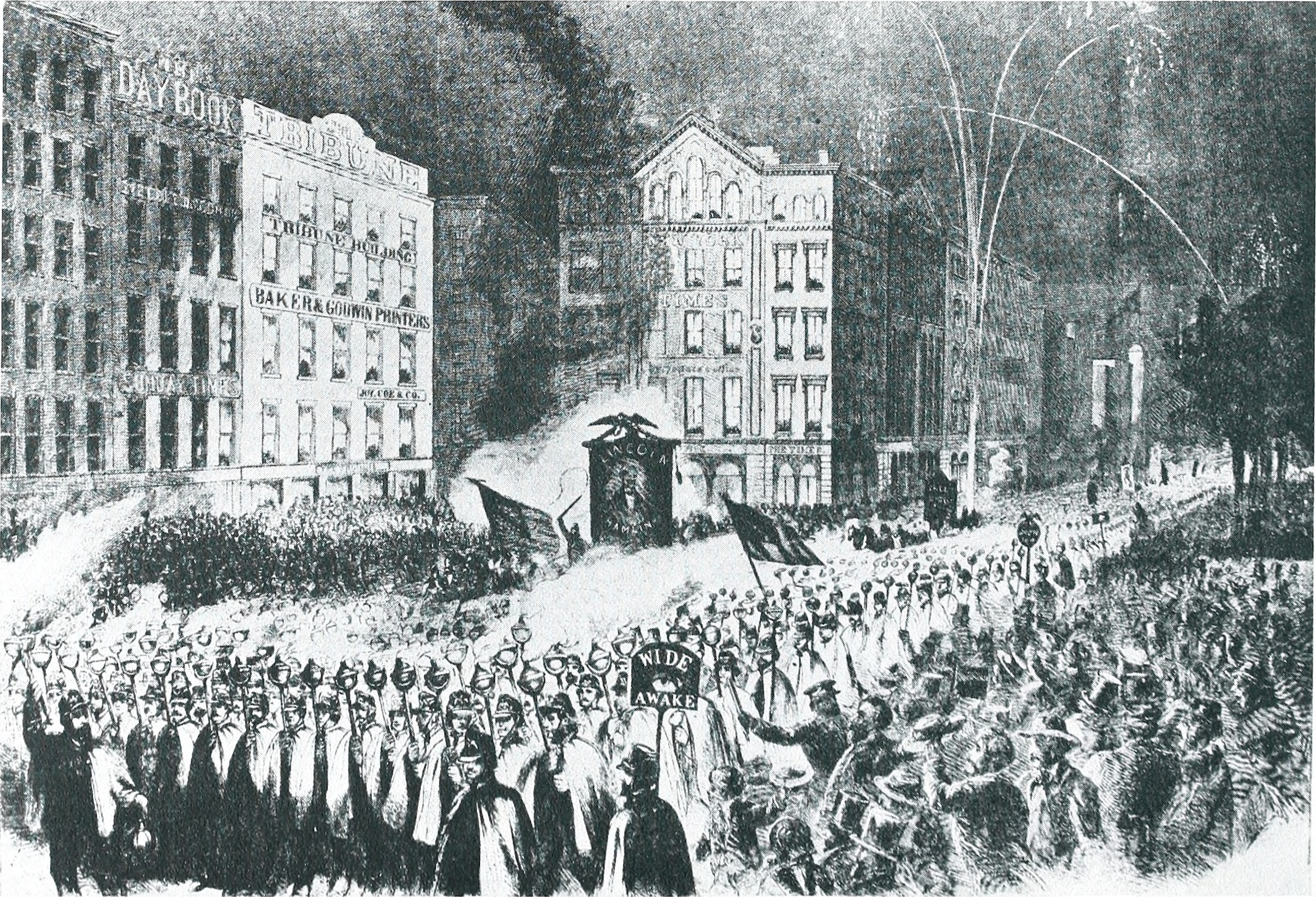
A Wide Awakes parade in Lower Manhattan, one of a series of political rallies held in New York, Philadelphia, Chicago, Cleveland, and Boston during the first week of October 1860

The Wide Awakes was a youth organization and uniformed "marching club" cultivated by the Republican Party during the 1860 presidential election in the United States. Using popular social events, an ethos of competitive fraternity, and even promotional comic books, the organization introduced many to political participation and proclaimed itself as the newfound voice of younger voters. The structured militant Wide Awakes appealed to a generation which had been profoundly shaken by the partisan instability in the 1850s, and offered young northerners a much-needed political identity. Once the Civil War began, young members of local "Wide Awake" chapters volunteered in large numbers for the U.S. Army; historians estimate that up to 75% of Wide Awakes served during the Civil War, as compared to approximately 50% of Northern men as a whole (to some extent this is due to the fact that members of the Wide Awakes tended to be younger).

== Overview ==
In February 1860, abolitionist Cassius Marcellus Clay spoke in Hartford, Connecticut. As five textile clerks led a torch-lit march through town after the speech, they successfully fought off an attack by Democratic Party members. Adopting the uniform of black capes that such torchbearers wore to protect themselves from dripping oil onto their clothing, local Republicans were spurred by the incident to form the Wide Awakes.

In early March 1860, Abraham Lincoln spoke in Hartford, Connecticut, against the spread of slavery and for the right of workers to strike. Five store clerks that belonged to the Wide Awakes decided to join a parade for Lincoln, who delighted in the torchlight escort back to his hotel provided for him after his speech. Over the ensuing weeks, the Lincoln campaign made plans to develop Wide Awakes throughout the country and to use them to spearhead large voter registration drives, since they knew that new and young voters tended to embrace similarly new and young parties.

Members of the Wide Awakes were described by The New York Times as "young men of character and energy, earnest in their Republican convictions and enthusiastic in prosecuting the canvass on which we have entered." In Chicago, on October 3, 1860, 10,000 Wide Awakes marched in a three-mile procession. The story on that rally occupied eight columns of the Chicago Tribune. In Indiana, one historian reported:

1860 was the most colorful in the memory of the Hoosier electorate. "Speeches, day and night, torch-light processions, and all kinds of noise and confusion are the go, with all parties," commented the "independent" Indianapolis Locomotive. Congressman Julian too was impressed by the "contrivance and spectacular display" which prevailed in the current canvass. Each party took unusual pains to mobilize its followers in disciplined political clubs, but the most remarkable of these were the Lincoln "Rail Maulers" and "Wide Awakes," whose organizations extended throughout the state. Clad in gaudy uniforms the members of these quasi-military bands participated in all Republican demonstrations. The "Wide Awakes" in particular were well drilled and served as political police in escorting party speakers and in preserving order at public meetings. Party emulation made every political rally the occasion for carefully arranged parades through banner-bedecked streets, torchlight processions, elaborate floats and transparencies, blaring bands, and fireworks.

By the middle of the 1860 campaign, Republicans bragged that they had Wide Awake chapters in every county of every northern (free) state. On the day of Lincoln's election as president, Wide Awakes had grown to 500,000 members. The group remained active for several decades.

== Rituals ==
=== Uniform and tactics ===
The Wide Awakes were a marching club. Their uniform was a full robe or cape and a military style hat, both made of black, shiny fabric. They carried a torch six feet in length to which a large flaming pivoting whale-oil container was mounted. Some carried rail-splitter axes strapped to their backs. The axes and split rails symbolized Abraham Lincoln, "the rail splitter."

They marched without speaking, eyes fixed straight ahead. Their only sound was the rhythm of a marching drum and the noise of their boots striking the ground in unison. Their marches were at night, lit by torches, in outdoor public places in cities in the American northeast. The gatherings of the Wide Awakes were very different from all previous American political rallies, which featured boisterous daytime parades, songs, and brass bands.

A Boston Wide Awake rally in October 1860 was one of the last before Lincoln was elected and the Civil War began. In this rally, Wide Awakes lit their torches all at the same moment, synchronized by the sound of a single gunshot. They marched in a zig-zag pattern imitating a split-rail fence. They held banners with anti-slavery messages, such as The Pilgrims Did Not Found an Empire for Slavery. The rally included both black and white people. A company of 200 Black men, the West Boston Wide Awakes, held a banner reading God Never Made a Tyrant or a Slave.

=== Chapter organization ===
Little is known about the national organization of the Wide Awakes, if indeed any formal governing body existed at all. The clubs seem to have been organized by city into local chapters. Surviving minutes of the Waupun, Wisconsin, chapter restrict membership to males 18 and older. The member had to "furnish himself with the style of uniform adopted by this Club." The chapter had a military-style officer system consisting of a captain and the 1st to 4th lieutenants.

The Captain shall have command of the Club at all times; in his absence the Lieutenants shall have command in the order of their rank. Every member of this club shall attend all the meetings whether regular or special; and when on duty or in attendance at the meetings, shall obey the officers in command, and shall at all times perform such duties as shall be required of him by the officers in command.

=== Social dimensions ===
Whatever their names, marching clubs of both parties often had bands and fancy uniforms. The social dimensions have been described:

The young men and boys who joined the Wide-Awakes, Invincibles, and other marching clubs were sold inexpensive uniforms and taught impressive march maneuvers. In Marion the Wide-Awake uniform consisted of an oil cloth cape and cap and a red sash, which along with a lamp or torch cost $1.33. Their "worm fence march" can be imagined, as can a nice connection to Lincoln as rail splitter—a connection that does remind us of the log-cabin and hard cider symbolism of earlier days [of 1840]. The more important connection to be made, however, is to the "militia fever" of the 1850s. Many Americans north and south delighted in military uniforms and titles, musters and parades, and the formal balls their companies sponsored during the winter social season. Their younger brothers no doubt delighted in aping them, so far as $1.33 would allow, while their parents were provided with a means by which youthful rowdyism was, for a time, channeled into a military form of discipline. The regular campaign clubs, meanwhile, were given a different attraction. One of the first items of business, once the club was organized, was to invite "the ladies" to meetings. Many members were single young men, and the campaign occurred during a relatively slow social season following the picnics, steamboat excursions, and other outings of the summer, and preceding the balls sponsored by militia companies, fire companies, and fraternal lodges during the winter. Campaign clubs helped to extend and connect the social seasons for single young men and women, and gave both an occasion for high-spirited travel. "Coming home there was fun," wrote the Democratic editor of a Dubuque Republican club excursion to a rally in Galena. "There were frequent 'three cheers for Miss Nancy Rogers.' ... Captain Pat Conger was the best looking man on the ground and we can only say that it is a pity he is not a Democrat."

=== Mission statement ===
Typical Wide Awakes chapters also adopted an unofficial mission statement. The following example comes from the Chicago chapter:

1. To act as a political police.
2. To do escort duty to all prominent Republican speakers who visit our place to address our citizens.
3. To attend all public meetings in a body and see that order is kept and that the speaker and meeting is not disturbed.
4. To attend the polls and see that justice is done to every legal voter.
5. To conduct themselves in such a manner as to induce all Republicans to join them.
6. To be a body joined together in large numbers to work for the good of the Republican Ticket.

=== Membership certificate ===
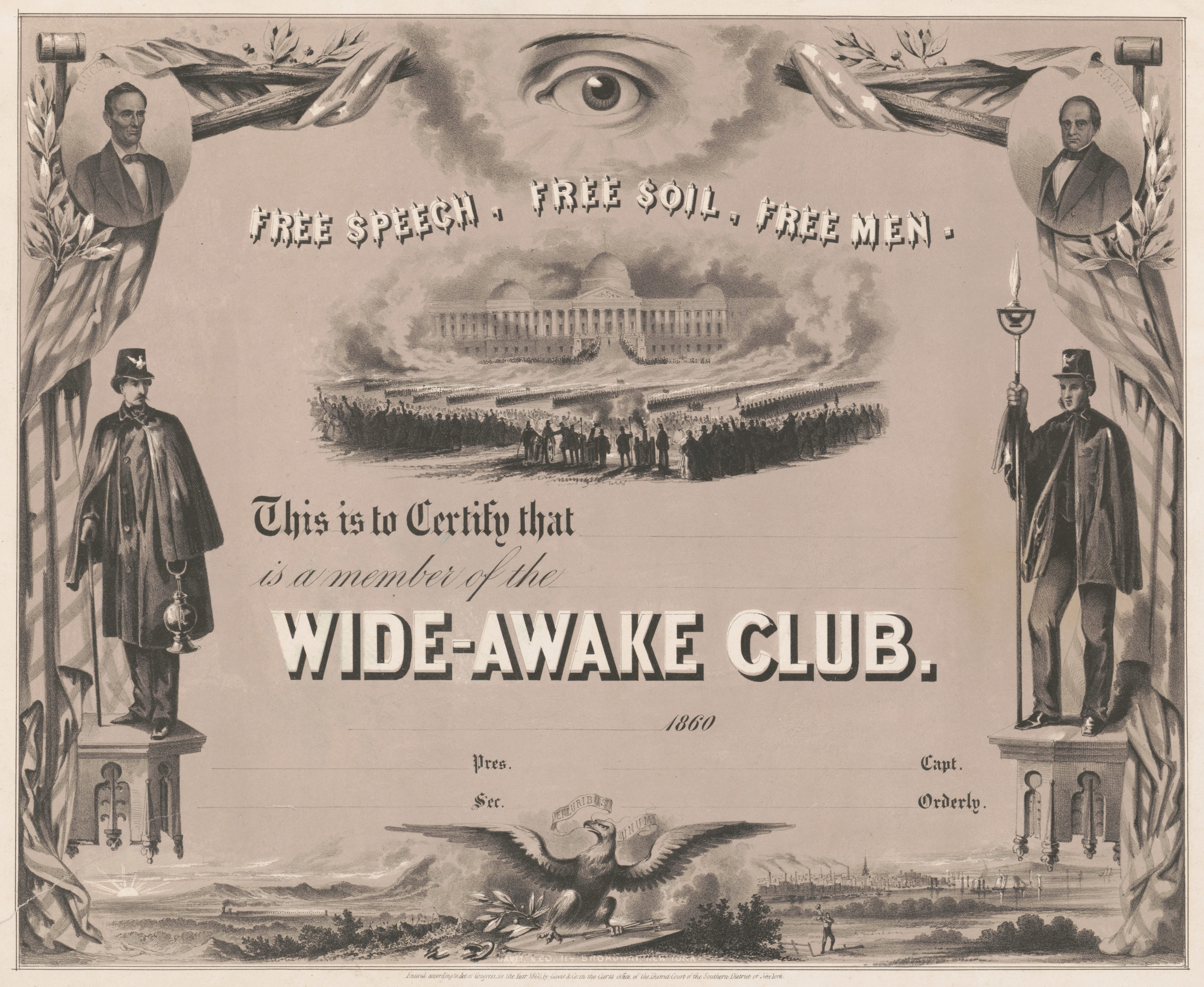
A membership certificate for the Wide-Awake Club: "Free speech, free soil, free men. This is to certify that... is a member of the... Wide-Awake Club."

This particular membership certificate of the Wide Awakes has a central vignette showing crowds and troops before the US Capitol. Some of the troops march in long parade lines, others fire cannons into the air toward the Capitol. Crowds line the Capitol steps, flanking a lone figure, probably Abraham Lincoln, who ascends toward the building's entrance. The certificate is framed by an American flag draped over a rail fence, with olive branches at the top. In the upper corners are oval medallions of Lincoln (left) and his running mate, Hannibal Hamlin (right). Rail-splitter's mallets appear in the corners. A vigilant eye peers from a halo of clouds at the center. On either side stand uniformed members of the society, wearing their characteristic short capes and visored caps. One holds a staff and a lantern (left), and the other holds a burning torch. Below, an eagle on a shield holds arrows, an olive branch, and an E pluribus unum streamer. Broken shackles lie before him. In the left distance, the sun rises over a mountainous landscape and a locomotive chugs across the plains. On the right is a more industrial scene: an Eastern city with its harbor full of boats. In the foreground a man hammers a wedge into a wooden rail.

== Stone's Prairie Riot ==
In August 1860, a political rally was scheduled to be held at Stone's Prairie in Adams County, Illinois, near the modern village of Plainville. This area, in the far west of Illinois, was familiar to two of the presidential candidates. Although the Republican candidate, Abraham Lincoln, was known in the area, his Democratic opponent, Stephen Douglas, had practiced law nearby. In addition to local animosity, Adams County was close to the border with Missouri, a slave state.

The rally was organized by the Republicans. When it was initially announced, there was an invitation to Democratic speakers. Although the invitation was later withdrawn, that fact was not widely disseminated, which resulted in confusion as to whether it was to be a Republican rally or a debate between Republican and Democratic supporters.

During the 1860 campaign, it was a common practice for settlements to raise poles, as much as 150 feet (46 meters) high. The political parties hung flags and effigies of the candidates they opposed from the poles.

On the way to the rally, the Quincy Wide Awakes passed through Payson, the residents of which had erected a pole with an offensive effigy of Lincoln astride a rail. The Wide Awakes, however, carried a banner with an equally offensive depiction of a drunken Douglas falling over a pile of rails. An early confrontation was avoided, with the Wide Awakes proceeding to Stone's Creek.

The August 25, 1860 rally involved around 7000 participants. Democrats appeared expecting to hear their candidates in a debate. They were instead treated to a podium of Republicans, whom they heckled. The Wide Awakes defended the speakers, and a general melee resulted, involving several hundred men.

After the rally, the Wide Awakes returned through Payson, where they found a hundred Democrats guarding their pole. Although Wide Awakes avoided confrontation, shots were fired at them while they left town. The Wide Awakes' flag was pierced by shots, and several were reported to have been injured.

== Southern reaction ==
In 1860, Texas Senator Louis Wigfall alleged that Wide Awakes were behind a wave of arson and vandalism, opposing "one–half million of men uniformed and drilled, and the purpose of their organization to sweep the country in which I live with fire and sword." The Wide Awakes represented the region's minority of slave and land owners' greatest fear: an oppressive force bent on marching down, liberating the slaves, stealing their land, and pushing aside their way of life. Their outfits and equipment only further incited that fear with beliefs that "they parade at midnight, carry rails to break open our doors, torches to fire our dwellings, and beneath their long black capes, the knife to cut our throats."

On October 25, 1858, Senator Seward of New York stated to an excited crowd that "a revolution has begun" and alluded to Wide Awakes as "forces with which to recover back again all the fields... and to confound and overthrow, by one decisive blow, the betrayers of the constitution and freedom forever." To the South, the Wide Awakes and the North would be content only when the South was fully dominated.

The South recognized the need for their own Wide Awakes and thus started a movement to create "a counteracting organization in the South," dubbed the "Minutemen," after the American Revolution militia of the same name. It would no longer entertain the "abhorrence of the rapine, murder, insurrection, pollution and incendiarism which have been plotted by the deluded and vicious of the North, against the chastity, law and prosperity of innocent and unoffending citizens of the South." The Minutemen were expected "to form an armed body of men... whose duty is to arm, equip and drill, and be ready for any emergency that may arise in the present perilous position of Southern States." The fear of the Wide Awakes resulted in Minutemen companies forming all over the South. Like their enemy, they too held torch rallies and wore their own uniforms, complete with an official badge of "a blue rosette... to be worn upon the side of the hat."

In Washington, D.C., and Baltimore, Maryland, opponents of the Wide Awakes formed the National Volunteers, which were involved in the Baltimore riot of 1861 that produced the first deaths of the American Civil War. In this April 1861 incident, Copperhead anti-war Democrats mobilized the National Volunteers to attack the Massachusetts and Pennsylvania state militias as they passed through the city en route to Washington, D.C..

== Wartime activities ==
After Lincoln called out the militia in April 1861, the Republican Wide Awakes, the Democratic "Douglas Invincibles," and other parade groups volunteered en masse for the Union army. In 1864, reports of political rallies noted the "Northwestern Wide Awakes, the Great Western Light Guard Band, and the 24th Illinois Infantry" at a Chicago meeting. On November 5, the Chicago Union Campaign Committee, the name of Lincoln's party that year, declared:

"On Tuesday next the destiny of the American Republic is to be settled. We appeal to Union men. We appeal to merchants to close their stores, manufacturers to permit their clerks and laborers to go to the polls, the Board of Trade to close, the Union Leagues and Wide Awakes to come out. The rebellion must be put down."

== Defense of St. Louis ==
In early 1861, the Wide Awakes chapter in St. Louis, with the encouragement of U.S. Congressman Francis Preston Blair Jr. and U.S. Army officer Nathaniel Lyon, became the core of a St. Louis "Home Guard" that played a significant role in events that kept Missouri in the Union. In April 1861, the pro-Confederacy Governor of Missouri, Claiborne Fox Jackson, began organizing an attempt to capture the federal arsenal in St. Louis as part of an effort to bring Missouri into the Confederacy. The federal arsenal was defended by a small detachment of U.S. troops commanded by U.S. Army Captain Nathaniel Lyon. Governor Jackson ordered 700 largely pro-secessionist Missouri State Militia members to encamp within five miles of the federal arsenal (an encampment which became known as "Camp Jackson") and, in correspondence with Confederate President Jefferson Davis, received promises of arms and heavy artillery to be used to seize the federal arsenal for the Confederate cause. In response to these efforts, Lyon transferred most of the weapons from the St. Louis arsenal to safety in Illinois and used some to arm the Home Guard (of which the Wide Awakes formed the core).

Once the arsenal was secured, on May 10, 1861, Lyon led his U.S. army regulars and the home guard troops to capture the pro-secessionist state militia forces at Camp Jackson. Outnumbered, the would-be capturers of the arsenal surrendered and those who would not swear loyalty to the United States were marched under guard to the arsenal. A hostile crowd gathered along the line of march and began shouting anti-German and pro-Confederate slogans and throwing paving stones at Lyon's forces. After a shot was fired (attributed to a drunken onlooker), Lyon's forces fired into the crowd and killed approximately 30. The entire incident became known as the "Camp Jackson Affair" and is regarded as a significant precipitating event in the Civil War in Missouri (which formally began one month later, on June 11, 1861). The St. Louis Wide Awakes, as members of the Home Guard, were regarded as central to the taking of Camp Jackson and the Home Guard was later mustered into formal federal service.

== Legacy ==
Scholars argue that any connection between the Wide Awakes and the provenance of woke as political slang remains tenuous. Conversely, cultural memory of the Wide Awakes has impacted various movements. For example, during the COVID-19 pandemic in the United States, activists dedicated to "artistic sovereignty" and "liberation" intentionally and explicitly " 'sampled and remixed the Wide Awakes' " as both an idea and social movement. Black Thought, who helped spearhead these " "remixed' " Wide Awakes, told The New York Times that, " 'throughout history, it's been the young people and creatives and intellectuals and philosophers and — just the visionaries — who understood the power in uniting, and who contributed to the greatest progress. So what the Wide Awakes represent, in my mind, is that.' " Also during the pandemic, Ben Domenech, critic of the Never Trump movement and its allusions to Lincoln's Republican Party, praised the Wide Awakes for instilling fear in slaveholders and for their "massive rallies that supported Lincoln, acting as security to the harassment of pro-liberty speakers." Domenech favored "wide awake" over "wokeness" because the latter was "designed to put you asleep."

Additional scholars have situated this Wide Awake movement within the context of protests against Donald Trump. Historian Manisha Sinha, for instance, argued in 2020 that the "generation of enthusiastic young men organized 'Wide Awakes', street demonstrations in support of Lincoln and the Republican Party, much like the so-called 'woke' generation of Americans who have flooded the streets demanding racial justice [did] in the Movement for Black Lives...The choice – as the Republicans of the Lincoln Project, who have broken with their party, put it – is between America and Trump." Likewise, the sister of Cole Allen, the suspect in the 2026 White House Correspondents' dinner shooting, informed the Secret Service that her brother planned to "do 'something' to fix what he saw as problems in this country, adding he was part of 'The Wide Awakes.' " Following this disclosure, the United States Department of Justice opened an investigation into any connection between the current Wide Awake movement and the shooting.

The climate justice group of activists named the Sunrise Movement have cited the Wide Awakes as an influence ("At Sunrise Movement, we have often taken inspiration from the Wide Awakes").

== See also ==
- History of the United States Republican Party
- American election campaigns in the 19th century
- Woke (slang)
