= Ellington Township, Illinois =

Township in Illinois, US

Ellington Township
- Township
- Location in Adams County

- Adams County's location in Illinois
- Coordinates: 39°58′46″N 91°18′48″W
- Country: United States
- State: Illinois
- County: Adams
- Established: November 6, 1849

Area
  - Total: 34.3 sq mi (89 km^{2})
  - Land: 34.27 sq mi (88.8 km^{2})
  - Water: 0.03 sq mi (0.078 km^{2}) 0.09%
- Elevation: 720 ft (220 m)

Population (2020)
  - Total: 2,820
  - Density: 82.3/sq mi (31.8/km^{2})
- Time zone: UTC-6 (CST)
  - Summer (DST): UTC-5 (CDT)
- ZIP codes: 62301, 62338, 62359
- FIPS code: 17-001-23412

Ellington Township is one of twenty-two townships in Adams County, Illinois, United States. As of the 2020 census, its population was 2,820 and it contained 1,140 housing units. The southwest corner of the township is now part of Quincy Township.

== Geography ==
According to the 2010 census, the township has a total area of 34.3 square miles (89 km^{2}), of which 34.27 square miles (88.8 km^{2}) (or 99.91%) is land and 0.03 square miles (0.078 km^{2}) (or 0.09%) is water.

=== Unincorporated towns ===
- Bloomfield
- Ewbanks

(This list is based on USGS data and may include former settlements.)

=== Cemeteries ===
The township contains five cemeteries: Ellington Church, Kemp, Laughlin, Powell and Voorhees.

=== Major highways ===
- US Route 24
- Illinois State Route 96
- Illinois State Route 336

=== Airports and landing strips ===
- Ellington Field
- Mast Field

== Demographics ==
As of the 2020 census there were 2,820 people, 997 households, and 866 families residing in the township. The population density was 82.07 inhabitants per square mile (31.69/km^{2}). There were 1,140 housing units at an average density of 33.18 units per square mile (12.81 units/km^{2}). The racial makeup of the township was 94.22% White, 1.10% African American, 0.14% Native American, 0.64% Asian, 0.00% Pacific Islander, 0.85% from other races, and 3.05% from two or more races. Hispanic or Latino of any race were 1.70% of the population.

There were 997 households, out of which 34.20% had children under the age of 18 living with them, 75.43% were married couples living together, 7.62% had a female householder with no spouse present, and 13.14% were non-families. 13.10% of all households were made up of individuals, and 8.20% had someone living alone who was 65 years of age or older. The average household size was 2.76 and the average family size was 2.98.

The township's age distribution consisted of 25.3% under the age of 18, 1.4% from 18 to 24, 23.3% from 25 to 44, 28.7% from 45 to 64, and 21.4% who were 65 years of age or older. The median age was 45.0 years. For every 100 females, there were 94.8 males. For every 100 females age 18 and over, there were 93.9 males.

The median income for a household in the township was $80,393, and the median income for a family was $88,452. Males had a median income of $50,849 versus $38,902 for females. The per capita income for the township was $36,961. About 0.0% of families and 2.1% of the population were below the poverty line, including 0.0% of those under age 18 and 1.7% of those age 65 or over.

Historical population
Census	Pop.	Note	%±
2010	2,855		—
2020	2,820		−1.2%
U.S. Decennial Census

== School districts ==
- Griggsville-Perry Community Unit School District 4
- Quincy Public School District 172

== Political districts ==
- Illinois' 17th congressional district
- State House District 93
- State Senate District 47
