= Fall Creek Township, Illinois =

Township in Illinois, US

Fall Creek Township
- Township
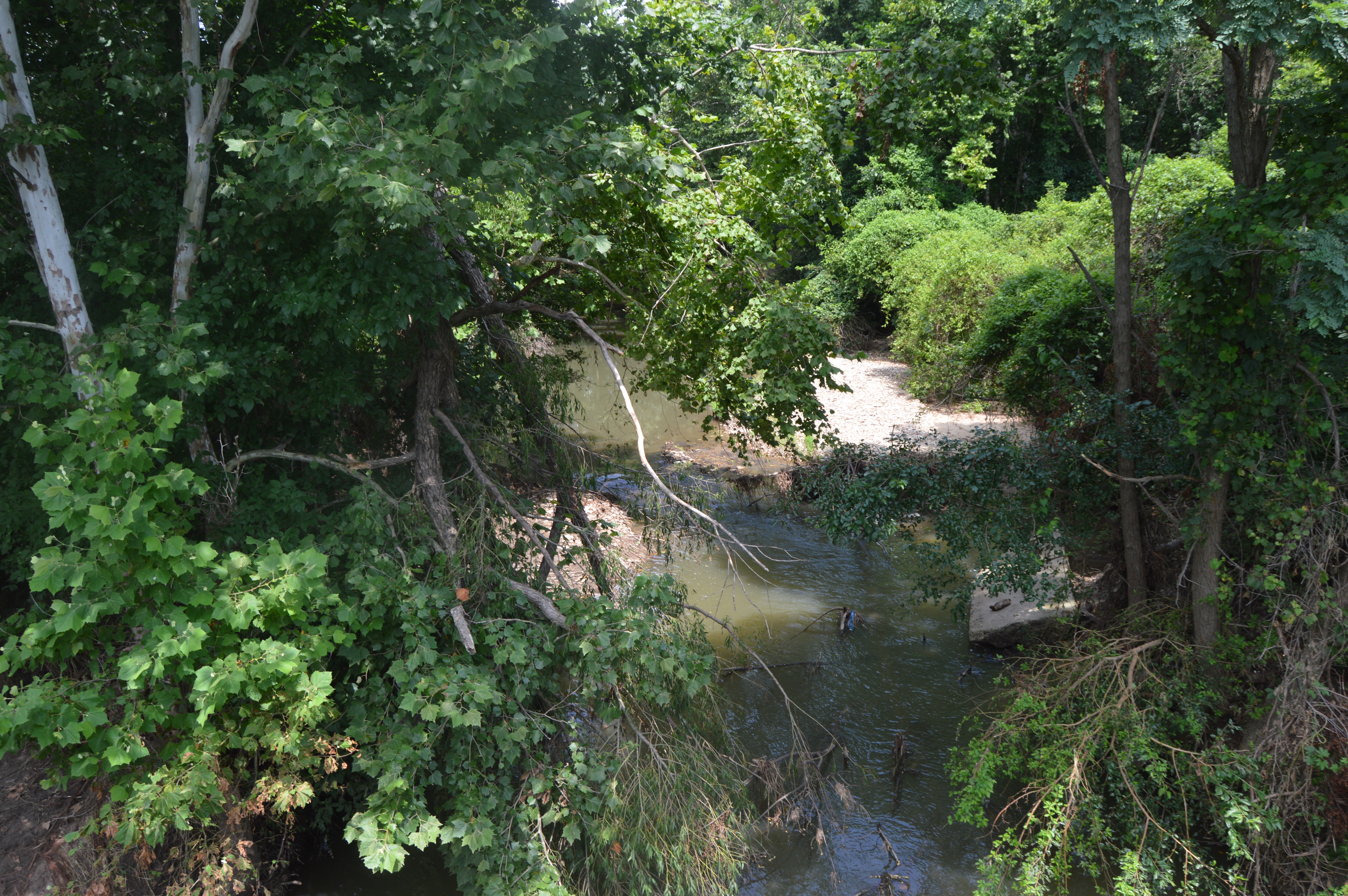
- Fall Creek, seen from the Illinois Route 57 bridge

- Location in Adams County

- Adams County's location in Illinois
- Coordinates: 39°48′33″N 91°20′12″W
- Country: United States
- State: Illinois
- County: Adams
- Established: November 6, 1849

Area
  - Total: 38.83 sq mi (100.6 km^{2})
  - Land: 36.43 sq mi (94.4 km^{2})
  - Water: 2.4 sq mi (6.2 km^{2}) 6.18%
- Elevation: 479 ft (146 m)

Population (2020)
  - Total: 536
  - Density: 14.7/sq mi (5.68/km^{2})
- Time zone: UTC-6 (CST)
  - Summer (DST): UTC-5 (CDT)
- ZIP codes: 62301, 62360
- FIPS code: 17-001-25258

Fall Creek Township is one of twenty-two townships in Adams County, Illinois, United States. As of the 2020 census, its population was 536 and it contained 228 housing units.

== Geography ==
According to the 2010 census, the township has a total area of 38.83 square miles (100.6 km^{2}), of which 36.43 square miles (94.4 km^{2}) (or 93.82%) is land and 2.4 square miles (6.2 km^{2}) (or 6.18%) is water.

=== Unincorporated towns ===
- Fall Creek
- Marblehead

(This list is based on USGS data and may include former settlements.)

=== Cemeteries ===
The township contains four cemeteries: Bluff Hall, Craigtown, Fall Creek Chapel and Thompson.

=== Major highways ===
- Interstate 172 (spur of Interstate 72)
- US Route 36
- Illinois State Route 57
- Illinois State Route 336

=== Rivers ===
- Mississippi River

== Demographics ==
As of the 2020 census there were 536 people, 232 households, and 177 families residing in the township. The population density was 13.84 inhabitants per square mile (5.34/km^{2}). There were 228 housing units at an average density of 5.89 units per square mile (2.27 units/km^{2}). The racial makeup of the township was 92.16% White, 1.12% African American, 0.19% Native American, 0.93% Asian, 0.19% Pacific Islander, 0.19% from other races, and 5.22% from two or more races. Hispanic or Latino of any race were 1.87% of the population.

There were 232 households, out of which 35.30% had children under the age of 18 living with them, 50.86% were married couples living together, none had a female householder with no spouse present, and 23.71% were non-families. 23.70% of all households were made up of individuals, and 0.00% had someone living alone who was 65 years of age or older. The average household size was 2.79 and the average family size was 2.99.

The township's age distribution consisted of 33.8% under the age of 18, 3.6% from 18 to 24, 25.9% from 25 to 44, 26.3% from 45 to 64, and 10.4% who were 65 years of age or older. The median age was 34.7 years. For every 100 females, there were 146.0 males. For every 100 females age 18 and over, there were 96.3 males.

The median income for a household in the township was $64,167, and the median income for a family was $64,196. Males had a median income of $45,096 versus $31,573 for females. The per capita income for the township was $29,180. About 33.3% of families and 35.5% of the population were below the poverty line, including 78.1% of those under age 18 and none of those age 65 or over.

Historical population
| Census | Pop. | Note | %± |
|---|---|---|---|
| 2010 | 529 | | — |
| 2020 | 536 | | 1.3% |

== School districts ==
- Payson Community Unit School District 1

== Political districts ==
- Illinois' 17th congressional district
- State House District 93
- State Senate District 47
