= Burton Township, Adams County, Illinois =

Township in Illinois, US

Burton Township
- Township
- Location in Adams County

- Adams County's location in Illinois
- Coordinates: 39°53′20″N 91°12′18″W
- Country: United States
- State: Illinois
- County: Adams

Area
  - Total: 38.03 sq mi (98.5 km^{2})
  - Land: 38.01 sq mi (98.4 km^{2})
  - Water: 0.02 sq mi (0.052 km^{2}) 0.05%
- Elevation: 712 ft (217 m)

Population (2020)
  - Total: 929
  - Density: 24.4/sq mi (9.44/km^{2})
- Time zone: UTC-6 (CST)
  - Summer (DST): UTC-5 (CDT)
- FIPS code: 17-001-10019

Burton Township is one of twenty-two townships in Adams County, Illinois, United States. As of the 2020 census, its population was 929 and it contained 395 housing units.

== Geography ==
According to the 2010 census, the township has a total area of 38.03 square miles (98.5 km^{2}), of which 38.01 square miles (98.4 km^{2}) (or 99.95%) is land and 0.02 square miles (0.052 km^{2}) (or 0.05%) is water.

=== Unincorporated towns ===
- Adams
- Burton

=== Cemeteries ===
The township contains five cemeteries: Burton, Independence, Kimmons, Newton and Tandy.

=== Major highways ===
- Illinois State Route 104

== Demographics ==
As of the 2020 census there were 929 people, 296 households, and 215 families residing in the township. The population density was 24.43 inhabitants per square mile (9.43/km^{2}). There were 395 housing units at an average density of 10.39 units per square mile (4.01 units/km^{2}). The racial makeup of the township was 97.09% White, 0.22% African American, 0.00% Native American, 0.22% Asian, 0.11% Pacific Islander, 0.32% from other races, and 2.05% from two or more races. Hispanic or Latino of any race were 0.43% of the population.

There were 296 households, out of which 29.70% had children under the age of 18 living with them, 67.57% were married couples living together, 5.07% had a female householder with no spouse present, and 27.36% were non-families. 17.60% of all households were made up of individuals, and 4.10% had someone living alone who was 65 years of age or older. The average household size was 2.53 and the average family size was 2.79.

The township's age distribution consisted of 24.3% under the age of 18, 0.0% from 18 to 24, 25.9% from 25 to 44, 26.4% from 45 to 64, and 23.3% who were 65 years of age or older. The median age was 43.9 years. For every 100 females, there were 106.6 males. For every 100 females age 18 and over, there were 91.9 males.

The median income for a household in the township was $76,000, and the median income for a family was $83,482. Males had a median income of $51,756 versus $35,610 for females. The per capita income for the township was $29,664. About 5.1% of families and 9.9% of the population were below the poverty line, including 13.7% of those under age 18 and 13.2% of those age 65 or over.

Historical population
Census	Pop.	Note	%±
2010	909		—
2020	929		2.2%
U.S. Decennial Census

== School districts ==
- Liberty Community Unit School District 2
- Payson Community Unit School District 1

== Congressional and state legislative districts ==
- Illinois' 18th congressional district
- State House District 93
- State Senate District 47
