= Payson High School =

Payson High School may refer to

- Payson High School (Arizona)
- Payson High School (Utah)
- Seymour High School (Illinois) is also known as Payson-Seymour High School, located in Payson, Illinois
