= Payson Township, Illinois =

Township in Illinois, US

Payson Township
- Township
- Location in Adams County

- Adams County's location in Illinois
- Coordinates: 39°47′59″N 91°12′28″W
- Country: United States
- State: Illinois
- County: Adams
- Established: November 6, 1849

Area
  - Total: 38.32 sq mi (99.2 km^{2})
  - Land: 38.28 sq mi (99.1 km^{2})
  - Water: 0.03 sq mi (0.078 km^{2}) 0.08%
- Elevation: 571 ft (174 m)

Population (2020)
  - Total: 1,743
  - Density: 45.53/sq mi (17.58/km^{2})
- Time zone: UTC-6 (CST)
  - Summer (DST): UTC-5 (CDT)
- ZIP codes: 62343, 62347, 62360, 62365
- FIPS code: 17-001-58278

Payson Township is one of twenty-two townships in Adams County, Illinois, United States. As of the 2020 census, its population was 1,743 and it contained 728 housing units.

== Geography ==
According to the 2010 census, the township has a total area of 38.32 square miles (99.2 km^{2}), of which 38.28 square miles (99.1 km^{2}) (or 99.90%) is land and 0.03 square miles (0.078 km^{2}) (or 0.08%) is water.

=== Cities ===
- Payson
- Plainville

=== Cemeteries ===
The township contains seven cemeteries: Dunn, Newmaw Family, Nichols Family, Payson New, Payson Old, Richland and Steward.

=== Major highways ===
- Illinois State Route 57

=== Airports and landing strips ===
- Krutmeier Airport

== Demographics ==
As of the 2020 census there were 1,743 people, 764 households, and 597 families residing in the township. The population density was 45.52 inhabitants per square mile (17.58/km^{2}). There were 728 housing units at an average density of 19.01 per square mile (7.34/km^{2}). The racial makeup of the township was 94.09% White, 0.34% African American, 0.29% Native American, 0.11% Asian, 0.17% Pacific Islander, 0.06% from other races, and 4.93% from two or more races. Hispanic or Latino of any race were 1.38% of the population.

There were 764 households, out of which 37.40% had children under the age of 18 living with them, 60.99% were married couples living together, 11.26% had a female householder with no spouse present, and 21.86% were non-families. 19.10% of all households were made up of individuals, and 6.70% had someone living alone who was 65 years of age or older. The average household size was 3.14 and the average family size was 3.53.

The township's age distribution consisted of 33.2% under the age of 18, 7.8% from 18 to 24, 27.9% from 25 to 44, 20.5% from 45 to 64, and 10.6% who were 65 years of age or older. The median age was 30.2 years. For every 100 females, there were 118.4 males. For every 100 females age 18 and over, there were 113.0 males.

The median income for a household in the township was $57,000, and the median income for a family was $65,417. Males had a median income of $36,528 versus $25,528 for females. The per capita income for the township was $23,386. About 4.4% of families and 8.4% of the population were below the poverty line, including 10.2% of those under age 18 and 1.2% of those age 65 or over.

Historical population
Census	Pop.	Note	%±
2010	1,795		—
2020	1,743		−2.9%
U.S. Decennial Census

== School districts ==
- Payson Community Unit School District 1

== Political districts ==
- Illinois' 18th congressional district
- State House District 93
- State Senate District 47
