= Columbus Township, Illinois =

Township in Illinois, US

Columbus Township
- Township
- Location in Adams County

- Adams County's location in Illinois
- Coordinates: 39°58′26″N 91°05′41″W
- Country: United States
- State: Illinois
- County: Adams
- Established: November 6, 1849

Area
  - Total: 37.36 sq mi (96.8 km^{2})
  - Land: 37.28 sq mi (96.6 km^{2})
  - Water: 0.08 sq mi (0.21 km^{2}) 0.21%
- Elevation: 676 ft (206 m)

Population (2020)
  - Total: 579
  - Density: 15.5/sq mi (6.00/km^{2})
- Time zone: UTC-6 (CST)
  - Summer (DST): UTC-5 (CDT)
- ZIP codes: 62301, 62320, 62324, 62325, 62347
- FIPS code: 17-001-15859

Columbus Township is one of twenty-two townships in Adams County, Illinois, United States. As of the 2010 census, its population was 579 and it contained 246 housing units.

== Geography ==
According to the 2010 census, the township has a total area of 37.36 square miles (96.8 km^{2}), of which 37.28 square miles (96.6 km^{2}) (or 99.79%) is land and 0.08 square miles (0.21 km^{2}) (or 0.21%) is water.

=== Cities ===
- Columbus (east three-quarters)

=== Cemeteries ===
The township contains seven cemeteries: Columbus, Earel, Hufnagel, Johnson, Saint Peters Evangelical Lutheran, Wilkes and Wolf Ridge.

== Demographics ==
As of the 2020 census there were 579 people, 231 households, and 190 families residing in the township. The population density was 15.48 inhabitants per square mile (5.98/km^{2}). There were 246 housing units at an average density of 6.58 units per square mile (2.54 units/km^{2}). The racial makeup of the township was 98.96% White, 0.17% African American, 0.00% Native American, 0.17% Asian, 0.00% Pacific Islander, 0.00% from other races, and 0.69% from two or more races. Hispanic or Latino of any race were 0.35% of the population.

There were 231 households, out of which 49.80% had children under the age of 18 living with them, 54.98% were married couples living together, 8.66% had a female householder with no spouse present, and 17.75% were non-families. 17.70% of all households were made up of individuals, and 15.20% had someone living alone who was 65 years of age or older. The average household size was 2.98 and the average family size was 3.02.

The township's age distribution consisted of 24.4% under the age of 18, 0.3% from 18 to 24, 30.3% from 25 to 44, 36.5% from 45 to 64, and 8.4% who were 65 years of age or older. The median age was 41.3 years. For every 100 females, there were 96.9 males. For every 100 females age 18 and over, there were 84.8 males.

The median income for a household in the township was $88,683. Males had a median income of $44,286 versus $39,316 for females. The per capita income for the township was $29,787. No families and 0.3% of the population were below the poverty line, including none of those under age 18 and none of those age 65 or over.

Historical population
Census	Pop.	Note	%±
2010	551		—
2020	579		5.1%

== School districts ==
- Central Community Unit School District 3
- Liberty Community Unit School District 2

== Political districts ==
- Illinois' 15th congressional district
- State House District 99
- State Senate District 50
