= Payson-Seymour High School =

Location
- 420 W. Brainard; Payson, Illinois 62360; United States
- 39.8167°N 91.2496°W

Information
- School type: public secondary
- Motto: Hail to Blue and White
- School district: Payson Community Unit 1
- Principal: Greg Buescher
- Teaching staff: 17.40 (FTE)
- Grades: 7–12
- Gender: coed
- Enrollment: 229 (2023–2024)
- Average class size: 15.5
- Student to teacher ratio: 13.16
- Campus type: rural
- Colors: royal blue white
- Athletics conference: Pike County Conference
- Mascot: Indian
- Team name: (Lady) Indians
- Website: www.cusd1.org/District/Department/292-Payson-Seymour-JRH-HS

Payson-Seymour High School is a rural high school (grades 7–12) in Payson, Adams County, Illinois.

The ethnicity of the student population is 98% White, non-Hispanic and 2% two or more races.

The district which the school belongs to is in Adams County, and includes the municipalities of Payson and Plainville, the census-designated places of Burton, Fall Creek, and Richfield, and most of the Adams CDP.

== Sports ==
The school has several sports teams. The sports that the school offers are:

Fall:

- Boys & Girls Golf
- Volleyball
- Co-Op Football

Winter:

- Boys & Girls Basketball
- Cheerleading
- Dance

Spring:

- Baseball
- Softball
- Track
