= Marblehead, Illinois =

- Unincorporated community
- Location of Marblehead within Illinois Marblehead, Illinois (the United States)
- Coordinates: 39°50′23″N 91°22′07″W
- Country: United States
- State: Illinois
- County: Adams
- Township: Fall Creek
- Elevation: 492 ft (150 m)
- Time zone: UTC-6 (CST)
  - Summer (DST): UTC-5 (CDT)
- GNIS feature ID: 412983

Marblehead is an unincorporated community in Adams County, Illinois, United States, just south of Quincy. Illinois State Route 57 is the main auxiliary route through the town and travels north to the business district of Quincy or south to Interstate 72 (near Hannibal, Missouri).

The community is part of the Quincy, IL–MO Micropolitan Statistical Area.

== Lake Marblehead ==
Marblehead is prone to flooding and during the Flood of 2008, the town was flooded with water from the Mississippi River. A temporary (and satirically named) "Lake Marblehead" was formed when the flood plain flooded.
