= Williamstown, Missouri =

- Census-Designated Place
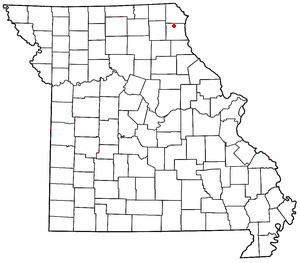
- Location of Williamstown in Missouri
- Coordinates: 40°14′27″N 91°47′51″W
- Country: United States
- State: Missouri
- County: Lewis

Area
  - Total: 0.27 sq mi (0.70 km^{2})
  - Land: 0.27 sq mi (0.70 km^{2})
  - Water: 0 sq mi (0.00 km^{2})
- Elevation: 725 ft (221 m)

Population (2020)
  - Total: 60
  - Density: 221.1/sq mi (85.38/km^{2})
- FIPS code: 29-80008
- GNIS feature ID: 2806411

Williamstown is an unincorporated community in northern Lewis County, Missouri, United States. It is located at the intersection of Missouri Supplemental Routes A and E, approximately twenty miles northwest of Canton. The community is part of the Quincy, IL–MO Micropolitan Statistical Area.

== History ==
Williamstown was laid out in 1856. The community was named for its founder, Minus Williams.

== Demographics ==
Historical population
Census	Pop.	Note	%±
2020	60		—
U.S. Decennial Census

Williamstown first appeared as a census designated place in the 2020 U.S. census.

== Education ==
It is in the Canton R-V School District.

== Notable people ==
- Elbert K. Fretwell educator
