= Durham, Missouri =

Unincorporated community in Missouri, U.S.

Coordinates: 39°58′34″N 91°40′05″W

Durham is an unincorporated community in southern Lewis County, Missouri, United States. It is located on Route 6, approximately ten miles southwest of La Grange. Durham is part of the Quincy, IL–MO Micropolitan Statistical Area.

A post office called Durham has been in operation since 1872. The community has the name of a railroad employee.
