= Fall Creek, Illinois =

- Census-designated place
- Location within Illinois Location within the United States
- Coordinates: 39°46′53″N 91°18′11″W
- Country: United States
- State: Illinois
- County: Adams
- Township: Fall Creek

Area
  - Total: 0.054 sq mi (0.14 km^{2})
  - Land: 0.054 sq mi (0.14 km^{2})
  - Water: 0 sq mi (0.00 km^{2})
- Elevation: 476 ft (145 m)

Population (2020)
  - Total: 31
  - Density: 563.8/sq mi (217.69/km^{2})
- Time zone: UTC-6 (Central (CST))
  - Summer (DST): UTC-5 (CDT)
- ZIP code: 62360 (Payson)
- Area code: 217
- FIPS code: 17-25245
- GNIS feature ID: 2804084

Fall Creek is an unincorporated community and census-designated place in Fall Creek Township, Adams County, Illinois, United States. Fall Creek is located along Interstate 172 southwest of Payson. As of the 2020 census, Fall Creek had a population of 31.

Fall Creek takes its name from a nearby creek of the same name, which was named for a waterfall along its course. A post office called Falls Creek was established in 1861, and closed in 1866. The post office was reestablished in 1872, the name was changed to Fallcreek in 1894, and the post office was discontinued in 1909.

== Geography ==
According to the 2021 census gazetteer files, Fall Creek has a total area of 0.06 square miles (0.16 km^{2}), all land.

== Demographics ==
Historical population
Census	Pop.	Note	%±
2020	31		—
U.S. Decennial Census

Fall Creek first appeared as a census designated place in the 2020 U.S. census.

As of the 2020 census there were 31 people, 14 households, and 14 families residing in the CDP. The population density was 563.64 inhabitants per square mile (217.62/km^{2}). There were 12 housing units at an average density of 218.18 per square mile (84.24/km^{2}). The racial makeup of the CDP was 93.55% White, 3.23% Asian, and 3.23% from two or more races.

== Education ==
The school district is Payson Community Unit School District 1. The comprehensive high school of that district is Payson-Seymour High School.
