= Keene Township, Illinois =

Township in Illinois, US

Keene Township
- Township
- Location in Adams County

- Adams County's location in Illinois
- Coordinates: 40°09′37″N 91°12′14″W
- Country: United States
- State: Illinois
- County: Adams
- Established: November 6, 1849

Area
  - Total: 36.4 sq mi (94 km^{2})
  - Land: 36.27 sq mi (93.9 km^{2})
  - Water: 0.14 sq mi (0.36 km^{2}) 0.38%
- Elevation: 646 ft (197 m)

Population (2020)
  - Total: 595
  - Density: 16.4/sq mi (6.33/km^{2})
- Time zone: UTC-6 (CST)
  - Summer (DST): UTC-5 (CDT)
- ZIP codes: 62320, 62349, 62351, 62380
- FIPS code: 17-001-39220

Keene Township is one of twenty-two townships in Adams County, Illinois, United States. As of the 2020 census, its population was 595 and it contained 268 housing units.

== Geography ==
According to the 2010 census, the township has a total area of 36.4 square miles (94 km^{2}), of which 36.27 square miles (93.9 km^{2}) (or 99.64%) is land and 0.14 square miles (0.36 km^{2}) (or 0.38%) is water.

=== Cities ===
- Loraine

=== Unincorporated towns ===
- Woodville

(This list is based on USGS data and may include former settlements.)

=== Cemeteries ===
The township contains four cemeteries: Curless, Loraine New, Loraine Old and Woodville.

=== Major highways ===
- Illinois State Route 61

=== Airports and landing strips ===
- Hemming Landing Strip
- Mealiff Landing Strip

== Demographics ==
As of the 2020 census there were 595 people, 282 households, and 189 families residing in the township. The population density was 16.34 inhabitants per square mile (6.31/km^{2}). There were 268 housing units at an average density of 7.36 per square mile (2.84/km^{2}). The racial makeup of the township was 93.78% White, 0.34% African American, 0.00% Native American, 0.17% Asian, 0.00% Pacific Islander, 0.17% from other races, and 5.55% from two or more races. Hispanic or Latino of any race were 0.84% of the population.

There were 282 households, out of which 23.40% had children under the age of 18 living with them, 61.35% were married couples living together, 2.84% had a female householder with no spouse present, and 32.98% were non-families. 25.90% of all households were made up of individuals, and 15.60% had someone living alone who was 65 years of age or older. The average household size was 2.40 and the average family size was 2.95.

The township's age distribution consisted of 21.2% under the age of 18, 2.7% from 18 to 24, 25.6% from 25 to 44, 19.4% from 45 to 64, and 31.1% who were 65 years of age or older. The median age was 46.0 years. For every 100 females, there were 90.4 males. For every 100 females age 18 and over, there were 93.5 males.

The median income for a household in the township was $49,375, and the median income for a family was $54,554. Males had a median income of $33,250 versus $34,464 for females. The per capita income for the township was $24,215. About 6.3% of families and 16.4% of the population were below the poverty line, including 26.4% of those under age 18 and 10.4% of those age 65 or over.

Historical population
Census	Pop.	Note	%±
2010	604		—
2020	595		−1.5%

== School districts ==
- Griggsville-Perry Community Unit School District 4
- Southeastern Community Unit School District 337

== Political districts ==
- Illinois' 15th congressional district
- State House District 93
- State Senate District 47
