= Texas slave insurrection panic of 1860 =

1860 massacre in Texas

The Texas slave insurrection panic of 1860, also known as the Texas Troubles, was a moral panic or mass hysteria and a resulting massacre in North and East Texas. Vigilantes killed an estimated 30 to 100 people whom they claimed had been planning a conspiracy of coordinated arson and slave rebellion. Law-enforcement agencies stepped aside to allow extrajudicial killing of Black Texans and of white people thought to be abolitionists. Historians consider the conspiracy to have been imaginary as almost no evidence of arson or rebellion was ever produced.

Popular attribution of the conspiracy to the supporters of Abraham Lincoln contributed to Southern secession from the Union upon Lincoln's election later in 1860, and thus to the American Civil War.

== Background ==
Panic about slave rebellion was common among white people throughout the antebellum South. Although organized rebellions were rare, occasional real examples such as Nat Turner's slave rebellion added to the apprehension that lead to panics over imagined rebellions. The population of slaves in Texas more than tripled in the decade leading up to 1860. Southerners were particularly fearful that the growing abolitionist movement would attempt to organize rebellion.

Local Texas governments expelled their Tejano or Mexican population because they believed Tejanos were unsupportive of slavery. Uvalde passed a law that Mexicans could not even pass through the county without a permit in 1857. Tejanos were murdered in the Cart War and numerous other attacks. Texans also attacked abolitionist ministers, particularly following John Brown's raid on Harpers Ferry in 1859. A book burning targeted textbooks that vigilantes in Palestine, Texas considered an abolitionist conspiracy.

== The panic ==
On July 8, 1860, fires broke out in more than a dozen Texas towns, destroying parts of Dallas, Denton, Pilot Point, and other communities. The fires were likely caused by the extremely hot and dry weather – 110 °F (43 °C) was reported that day in Dallas – and, in particular, by stores of white phosphorus matches which spontaneously combust in high heat.

Citizens generally accepted that the fires in their towns were caused by the hot weather. However, vigilantes in Dallas began to torture Black residents they considered suspicious, forcing confessions of arson. Three scapegoats named Patrick Jennings, Sam Smith, and Cato were executed. Charles R. Pryor, editor (before it burned down) of the Dallas Herald, wrote letters to other newspapers in the region describing the fires as a conspiracy "systematically conceived and the most ingeniously contrived" by two allegedly abolitionist Methodist ministers who had been expelled from Dallas a year before. Pryor believed the ministers wanted "to devastate, with fire and assassination, the whole of Northern Texas" by recruiting opponents of slavery to commit arson, and then to cause a slave revolt on an upcoming election day.

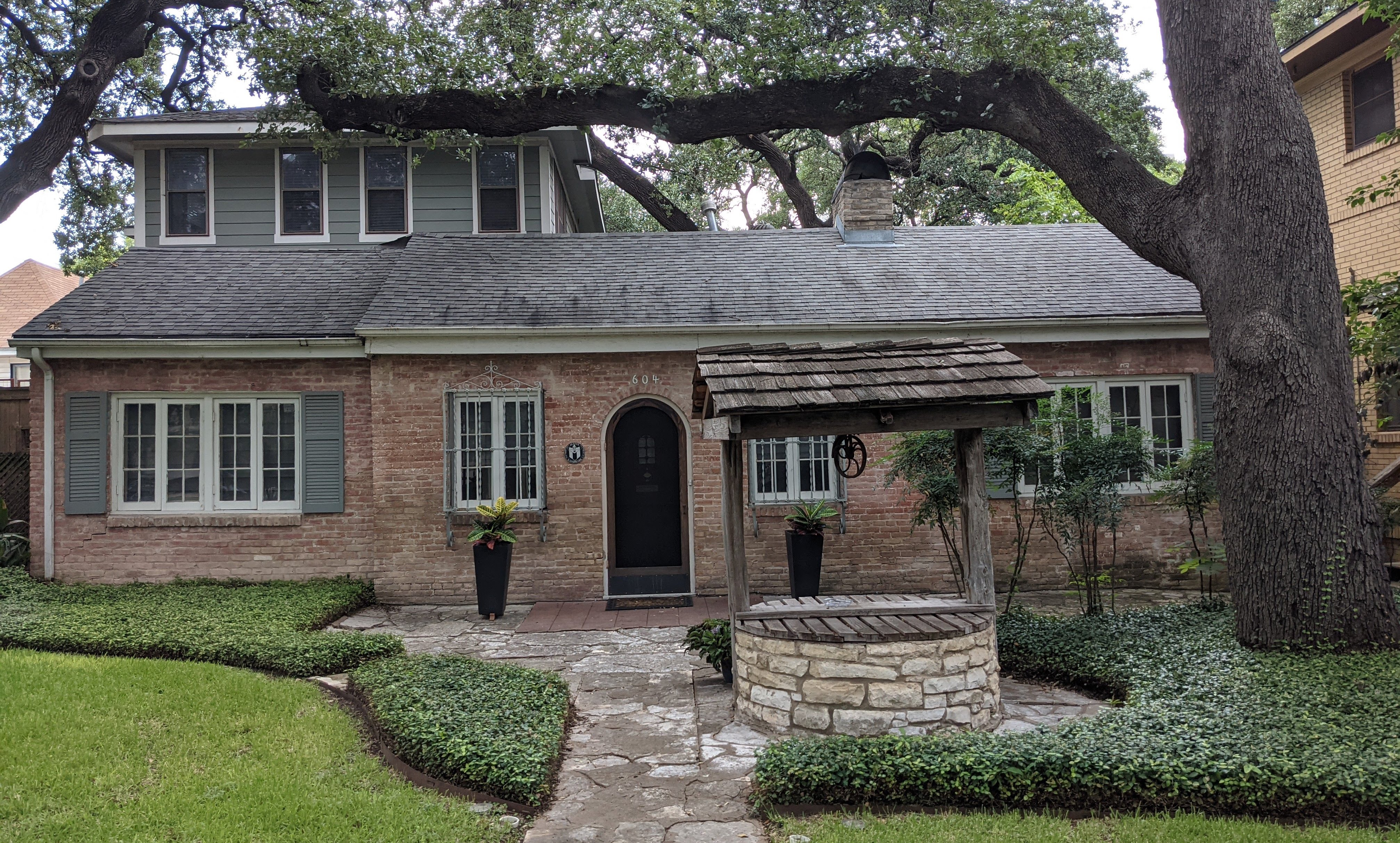
Lieutenant Governor Edward Clark's slave quarters in Austin, one of many places people were accused of conspiracy.

Pryor's letters were widely reprinted. Panic spread, and many communities in Texas formed vigilance committees to respond to the alleged conspiracy with racist violence. Through tortured confessions and their own paranoia, vigilance committees elaborated a complex conspiracy, imagining a white command hierarchy directing an army of Black arsonists, assassins, poisoners, and wife-stealers.

Dubious reports of fires, attempted arson, and abolitionist murder plots spread throughout the region. In Austin the mayor's office reported discovering caches of gunpowder, knives and other weapons in slave's quarters. The weapons were presumed to belong to white conspirators who could not be located. Fearful residents closed businesses and took up arms.

Night patrols hunted slaves, white Northerners, foreigners, Mexican Texans or anyone who didn't answer patrollers' questions to their satisfaction, were immediately lynched. Others were convicted in show trials and hung in public places. Law enforcement agencies allowed the secretive vigilantes to murder anyone the vigilantes accused of being an arsonist or abolitionist. Fort Worth's vigilance committee declared, "it is better for us to hang ninety-nine innocent men than to let one guilty one pass." According to historians, an estimated 30 to 100 people were killed, although "no hard evidence was ever adduced to prove the guilt of a single alleged Black arsonist or White abolitionist."

As the panic unfolded, Texas governor Sam Houston expressed skepticism. He believed the rumors of arson were politically motivated, spread "for no other purpose than to arouse the passions of the people and drive them into the Southern Disunion movement."

== Effects ==
Pro-slavery extremists used the allegations of slave rebellion to whip up support for secession throughout the American South, accusing Abraham Lincoln supporters of masterminding the conspiracy. White Southern newspapers blamed the torches of the Wide Awakes for the fires, and viewed the Wide Awakes as a military organization who would "erect the guillotine, tear down the temples of justice, sack the city and the plain, and overturn society" in the slave-holding South. Many who previously supported the Union became convinced that disunion was necessary if Lincoln were elected president, which did occur in November 1860. Texas seceded in 1861.

The conspiracy of arson and rebellion was treated as fact by journalists and scholars into the mid-20th century, though they often acknowledge it is unsubstantiated by evidence. For example, a 1949 article in the journal of the Texas State Historical Association says that violent reprisal is a justified response to insurrection "whether real or imagined."

Some men involved in the murders of 1860 became prominent, such as Texas Governor Richard Coke. The events themselves fell into obscurity; those responsible stopped talking about them. The events were commemorated in 1991 when a park near Dealey Plaza in Dallas was renamed Martyrs Park. It marks the site of the execution of Patrick Jennings, Sam Smith, and Cato.
