= Mary Frances Leach =

American chemist

Mary Frances Leach (March 22, 1858 – 1939) was an American chemist and professor of chemistry and hygiene.

== Early life and education ==
Leach was born in Payson, Illinois, the daughter of the Reverend Cephas A., and Mary Ann Scarborough Leach. She studied at Mount Holyoke College after a stint as an elementary school teacher in Massachusetts and received her associate degree in 1880. She then moved to Michigan and taught high school in various districts until 1891. In 1893, she received her bachelor's degree from the University of Michigan.

== Career ==
After graduating, Leach became a chemistry professor at her alma mater, Mount Holyoke, but returned to Michigan in 1901 to become a fellow and pursue her Ph.D., which she earned in 1903. While a professor at Mount Holyoke, she studied at the University of Zurich and the University of Göttingen. From 1906 to her retirement in 1921, she was a professor of hygiene and chemistry at the Western College of Women.
