= Richfield, Illinois =

- Unincorporated community
- Location within Illinois Location within the United States
- Coordinates: 39°48′58″N 91°07′14″W
- Country: United States
- State: Illinois
- County: Adams

Area
  - Total: 0.47 sq mi (1.21 km^{2})
  - Land: 0.47 sq mi (1.21 km^{2})
  - Water: 0 sq mi (0.00 km^{2})
- Elevation: 722 ft (220 m)

Population (2020)
  - Total: 26
  - Density: 55.6/sq mi (21.48/km^{2})
- Time zone: UTC-6 (Central (CST))
  - Summer (DST): UTC-5 (CDT)
- Area code: 217
- GNIS feature ID: 2804090

Richfield is an unincorporated community in Richfield Township, Adams County, Illinois, United States. As of the 2020 census, Richfield had a population of 26. Richfield is east of Payson.

== Demographics ==
Historical population
Census	Pop.	Note	%±
2020	26		—
U.S. Decennial Census

Richfield first appeared as a census designated place in the 2020 U.S. census.

== Education ==
The school district is Payson Community Unit School District 1. The comprehensive high school of that district is Payson-Seymour High School.
