= Bigneck, Illinois =

- Unincorporated community
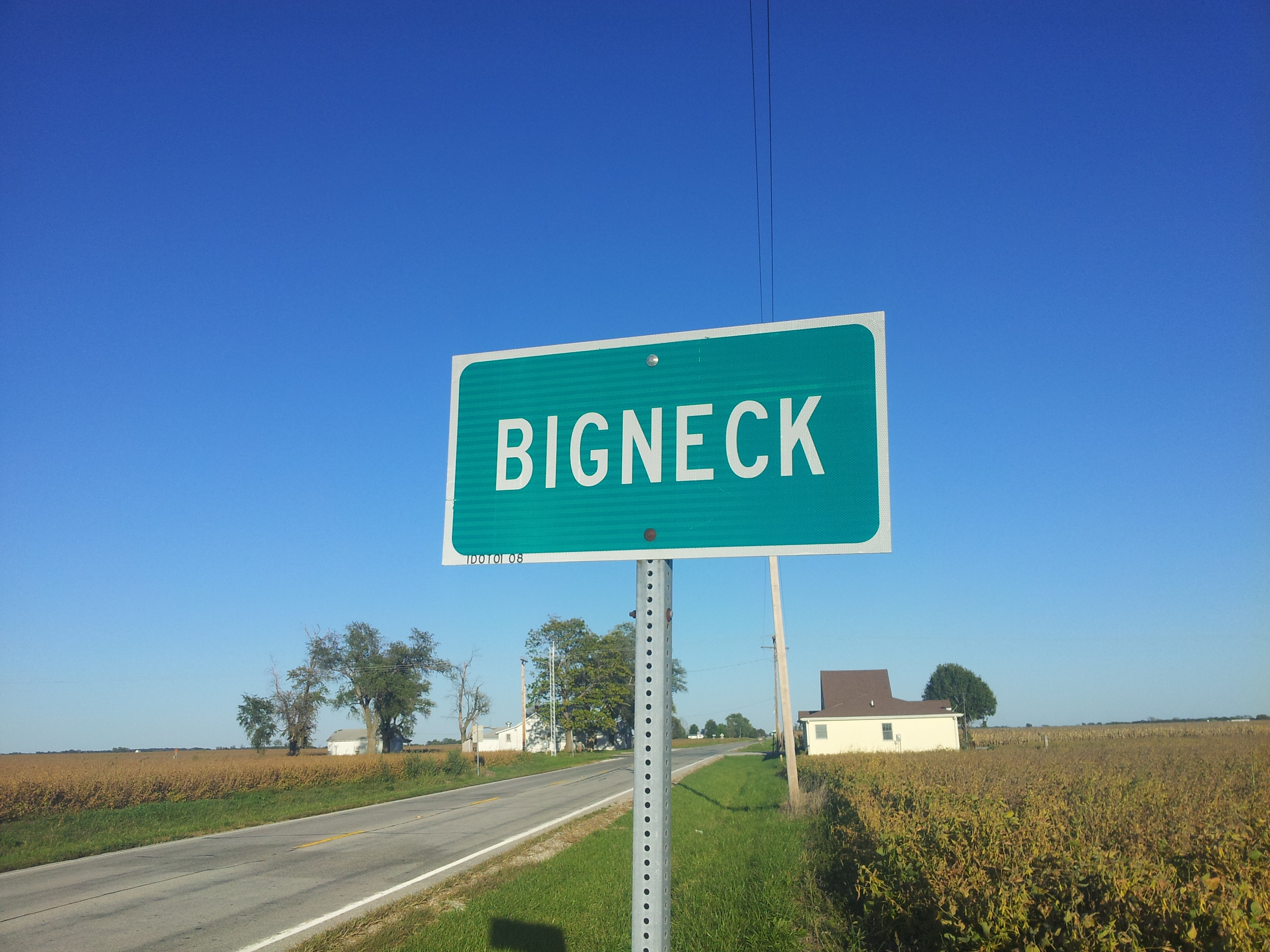
- The Illinois Department of Transportation sign entering Bigneck from Highway 61 North

- Location within Illinois Location within the United States
- Coordinates: 40°08′15″N 91°09′21″W
- Country: United States
- State: Illinois
- County: Adams
- Elevation: 673 ft (205 m)
- Time zone: UTC-6 (Central (CST))
  - Summer (DST): UTC-5 (CDT)
- Area code: 217
- GNIS feature ID: 422221

Bigneck, also known as Big Neck, is an unincorporated community in Keene Township, Adams County, Illinois, United States. Bigneck is located 7.7 miles (12.4 km) west-northwest of Golden. The community is served by Illinois Route 61. There remain about two houses in the community and no businesses. Bigneck once had a post office which is now defunct. A. Otis Arnold (1878–1941), Illinois businessman and politician, was born near Bigneck, in Adams County.
