= La Prairie, Illinois =

- Town
- Location of La Prairie in Adams County, Illinois.
- Coordinates: 40°08′49″N 91°00′03″W
- Country: USA
- State: Illinois
- County: Adams
- Township: Northeast
- Incorporated: April 15, 1869

Area
  - Total: 0.19 sq mi (0.50 km^{2})
  - Land: 0.19 sq mi (0.50 km^{2})
  - Water: 0 sq mi (0.00 km^{2})
- Elevation: 709 ft (216 m)

Population (2020)
  - Total: 42
  - Estimate (2024): 40 ▼
  - Density: 220/sq mi (84/km^{2})
- Time zone: UTC-6 (CST)
  - Summer (DST): UTC-5 (CDT)
- ZIP code: 62346
- Area code: 217
- FIPS code: 17-42080
- GNIS feature ID: 2398368

La Prairie is a village in Adams County, Illinois, United States. The population was 42 at the 2020 census. It is part of the Quincy, IL–MO Micropolitan Statistical Area.

== Geography ==
According to the 2021 census gazetteer files, La Prairie has a total area of 0.19 square miles (0.49 km^{2}), all land.

== Demographics ==
Historical population
Census	Pop.	Note	%±
1880	233		—
1890	194		−16.7%
1900	182		−6.2%
1910	187		2.7%
1920	174		−7.0%
1930	146		−16.1%
1940	141		−3.4%
1950	142		0.7%
1960	115		−19.0%
1970	85		−26.1%
1980	90		5.9%
1990	68		−24.4%
2000	60		−11.8%
2010	47		−21.7%
2020	42		−10.6%
U.S. Decennial Census

As of the 2020 census there were 42 people, 28 households, and 21 families residing in the village. The population density was 217.62 inhabitants per square mile (84.02/km^{2}). There were 25 housing units at an average density of 129.53 per square mile (50.01/km^{2}). The racial makeup of the village was 92.86% White, 2.38% from other races, and 4.76% from two or more races. Hispanic or Latino of any race were 2.38% of the population.

There were 28 households, out of which 39.3% had children under the age of 18 living with them, 71.43% were married couples living together, and 25.00% were non-families. 25.00% of all households were made up of individuals, and 21.43% had someone living alone who was 65 years of age or older. The average household size was 2.71 and the average family size was 2.29.

The village's age distribution consisted of 21.9% under the age of 18, 17.2% from 18 to 24, 26.5% from 25 to 44, 18.8% from 45 to 64, and 15.6% who were 65 years of age or older. The median age was 40.6 years. For every 100 females, there were 128.6 males. For every 100 females age 18 and over, there were 78.6 males.

The median income for a household in the village was $68,056, and the median income for a family was $69,028. Males had a median income of $36,250 versus $36,875 for females. The per capita income for the village was $21,044. About 0.0% of families and 3.1% of the population were below the poverty line, including none of those under age 18 and 20.0% of those age 65 or over.
