= Adams, Illinois =

- Census-designated place
- Location within Illinois Location within the United States
- Coordinates: 39°51′56″N 91°11′59″W
- Country: United States
- State: Illinois
- County: Adams
- Township: Burton
- Founded: 1838

Area
  - Total: 2.24 sq mi (5.79 km^{2})
  - Land: 2.24 sq mi (5.79 km^{2})
  - Water: 0 sq mi (0.00 km^{2})
- Elevation: 725 ft (221 m)

Population (2020)
  - Total: 75
  - Density: 33.5/sq mi (12.94/km^{2})
- Time zone: UTC-6 (Central (CST))
  - Summer (DST): UTC-5 (CDT)
- ZIP code: 62347 (Liberty)
- Area code: 217
- FIPS code: 17-00191
- GNIS feature ID: 2804080

Adams is an unincorporated town in Burton Township, Adams County, Illinois, United States, approximately 13 miles (21 km) southeast of Quincy. It is tracked by the census bureau as a census-designated place.

Adams was laid out in 1838 and as of the 2020 census, had a population of 75.

== Geography ==
According to the 2021 census gazetteer files, the area encompassed by the CDP has a total area of 2.24 square miles (5.80 km^{2}), all land.

== Demographics ==
Historical population
Census	Pop.	Note	%±
2020	75		—
U.S. Decennial Census

As of the 2020 census there were 75 people, 28 households, and 16 families residing in the CDP. The population density was 33.53 inhabitants per square mile (12.95/km^{2}). There were 35 housing units at an average density of 15.65 per square mile (6.04/km^{2}). The racial makeup of the CDP was 93.33% White, 1.33% African American, 0.00% Native American, 0.00% Asian, 0.00% Pacific Islander, 0.00% from other races, and 5.33% from two or more races. Hispanic or Latino of any race were 1.33% of the population.

== Education ==
The school district for most areas is Payson Community Unit School District 1. A portion is in the Liberty Community Unit School District 2. The comprehensive high school of the Payson district is Payson-Seymour High School, and the comprehensive high school of the Liberty district is Liberty High School.
