= Maywood, Missouri =

Unincorporated community in Missouri, U.S.

Coordinates: 39°57′15″N 91°36′01″W

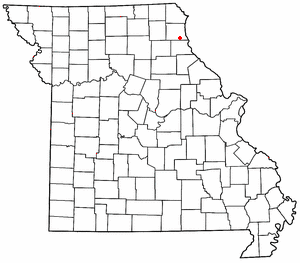

Maywood is an unincorporated community in southern Lewis County, Missouri, United States. It is located on Missouri Route V just north of the Lewis-Marion county line, approximately eleven miles northwest of Palmyra and ten miles west of Quincy, Illinois. The community is part of the Quincy, IL–MO Micropolitan Statistical Area. The ZIP Code for Maywood is 63454.

A post office called Maywood has been in operation since 1872. It is unclear why the name Maywood was applied to this community.
