= Burton, Illinois =

- Census-designated place
- Location of Burton within Illinois Burton, Illinois (the United States)
- Coordinates: 39°54′30″N 91°15′02″W
- Country: United States
- State: Illinois
- County: Adams
- Township: Burton

Area
  - Total: 0.33 sq mi (0.85 km^{2})
  - Land: 0.33 sq mi (0.85 km^{2})
  - Water: 0 sq mi (0.00 km^{2})
- Elevation: 650 ft (200 m)

Population (2020)
  - Total: 103
  - Density: 312.5/sq mi (120.64/km^{2})
- Time zone: UTC-6 (CST)
  - Summer (DST): UTC-5 (CDT)
- ZIP code: 62301 (Quincy)
- Area code: 217
- FIPS code: 17-10006
- GNIS feature ID: 2804083

Burton is an unincorporated community and census-designated place in Adams County approximately four miles east of Quincy. As of the 2020 census, Burton had a population of 103.

Burton was platted ca. 1836. A post office called Burton was established in 1840, and remained in operation until 1922.

== Geography ==
According to the 2021 census gazetteer files, Burton has a total area of 0.33 square miles (0.85 km^{2}), all land.

== Demographics ==
Historical population
Census	Pop.	Note	%±
2020	103		—
U.S. Decennial Census

Burton first appeared as a census designated place in the 2020 U.S. census.

As of the 2020 census there were 103 people, 27 households, and 13 families residing in the CDP. The population density was 312.12 inhabitants per square mile (120.51/km^{2}). There were 44 housing units at an average density of 133.33 per square mile (51.48/km^{2}). The racial makeup of the CDP was 98.06% White, 0.97% Pacific Islander, and 0.97% from two or more races.

== Education ==
The school district is Payson Community Unit School District 1. The comprehensive high school of that district is Payson-Seymour High School.

== See also ==
- List of unincorporated communities in Illinois
