= Payson, Illinois =

- Village
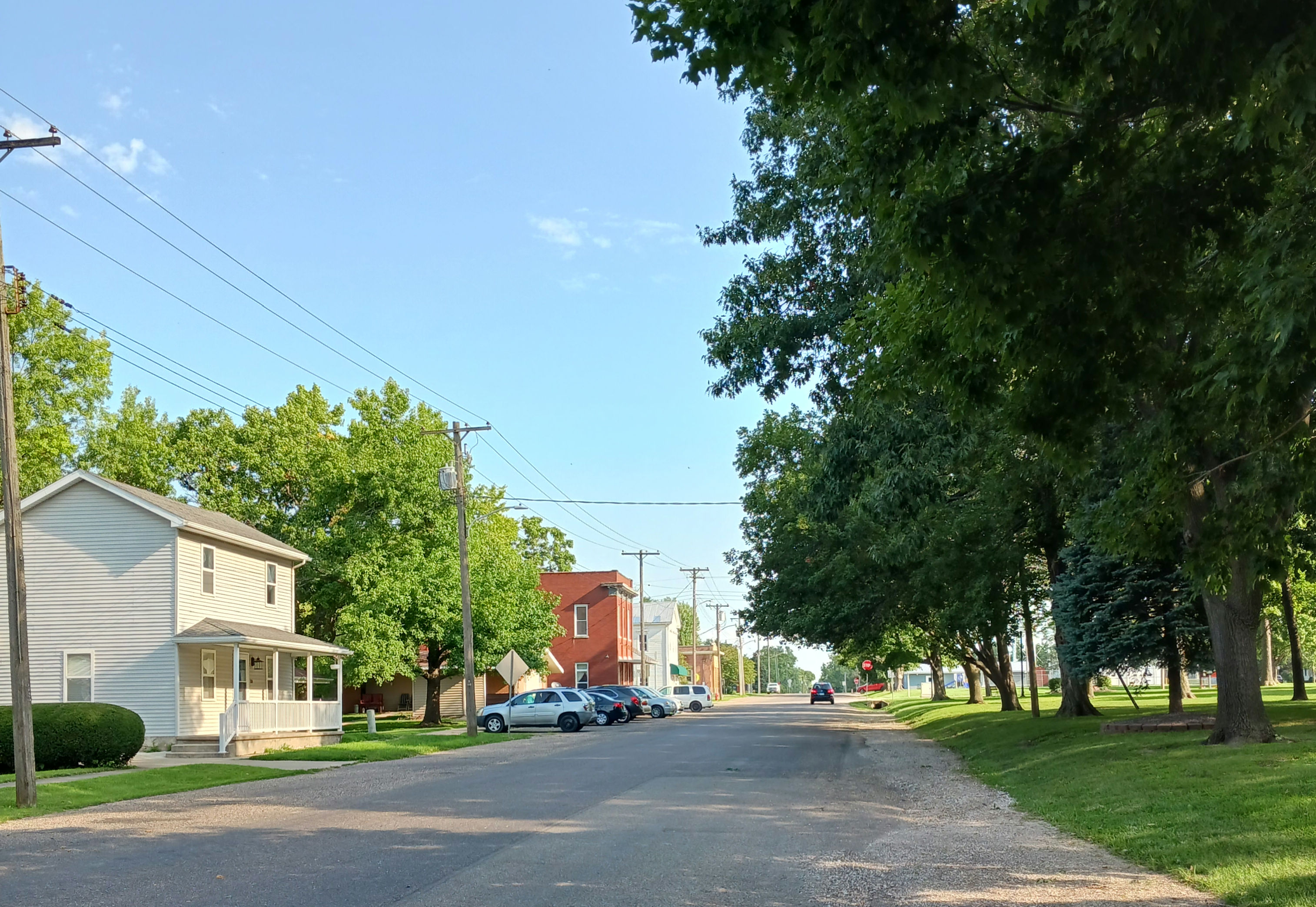
- Main Street

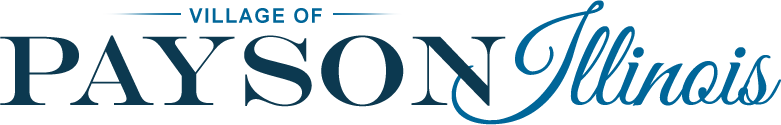
- Logo

- Location of Payson in Adams County, Illinois.
- Coordinates: 39°49′06″N 91°14′53″W
- Country: US
- State: Illinois
- County: Adams
- Township: Payson
- Platted: 1835

Area
  - Total: 1.17 sq mi (3.03 km^{2})
  - Land: 1.17 sq mi (3.03 km^{2})
  - Water: 0 sq mi (0.00 km^{2})
- Elevation: 745 ft (227 m)

Population (2020)
  - Total: 1,025
  - Estimate (2024): 998 ▼
  - Density: 876/sq mi (338/km^{2})
- Time zone: UTC-6 (CST)
  - Summer (DST): UTC-5 (CDT)
- ZIP code: 62360
- Area code: 217
- FIPS code: 17-58265
- GNIS feature ID: 2399639
- Website: paysonil.com

Payson is a village in Adams County, Illinois, United States. The population was 1,025 at the 2020 census. It is part of the Quincy, IL–MO Micropolitan Statistical Area.

== History ==
Payson was laid out in the Spring of 1835.

During the 1860 presidential campaign, the residents of Payson erected a pole on which they hung banners supporting the Democratic candidate, Stephen Douglas, and an effigy of Abraham Lincoln riding a rail. This resulted in two confrontations with the Quincy Wide Awakes, the Republican paramilitary organization, on August 25–26, 1860. During the second confrontation, shots were fired at the Wide Awakes, resulting in injuries. This action was related to the "Stone's Prairie Riot" at nearby Plainville.

== Geography ==
According to the 2021 census gazetteer files, Payson has a total area of 1.17 square miles (3.03 km^{2}), all land.

== Demographics ==
Historical population
Census	Pop.	Note	%±
1900	465		—
1910	467		0.4%
1920	453		−3.0%
1930	414		−8.6%
1940	456		10.1%
1950	490		7.5%
1960	502		2.4%
1970	589		17.3%
1980	1,065		80.8%
1990	1,114		4.6%
2000	1,066		−4.3%
2010	1,026		−3.8%
2020	1,025		−0.1%
U.S. Decennial Census

=== 2020 census ===
As of the 2020 census, Payson had a population of 1,025. The median age was 34.4 years. 29.7% of residents were under the age of 18 and 15.1% of residents were 65 years of age or older. For every 100 females there were 107.1 males, and for every 100 females age 18 and over there were 96.5 males age 18 and over.

The population density was 876.07 inhabitants per square mile (338.25/km^{2}). There were 407 housing units at an average density of 347.86 per square mile (134.31/km^{2}). 0.0% of residents lived in urban areas, while 100.0% lived in rural areas.

There were 375 households in Payson, of which 40.5% had children under the age of 18 living in them. Of all households, 54.7% were married-couple households, 14.9% were households with a male householder and no spouse or partner present, and 23.7% were households with a female householder and no spouse or partner present. About 22.4% of all households were made up of individuals and 8.5% had someone living alone who was 65 years of age or older.

There were 407 housing units, of which 7.9% were vacant. The homeowner vacancy rate was 0.7% and the rental vacancy rate was 4.4%.

Racial composition as of the 2020 census
Race	Number	Percent
White	960	93.7%
Black or African American	5	0.5%
American Indian and Alaska Native	2	0.2%
Asian	1	0.1%
Native Hawaiian and Other Pacific Islander	0	0.0%
Some other race	1	0.1%
Two or more races	56	5.5%
Hispanic or Latino (of any race)	16	1.6%

=== Income and poverty ===
The median income for a household in the village was $62,813, and the median income for a family was $66,389. Males had a median income of $37,125 versus $25,278 for females. The per capita income for the village was $24,765. About 5.8% of families and 10.9% of the population were below the poverty line, including 12.7% of those under age 18 and 2.2% of those age 65 or over.

=== Education ===
Public education is provided at Payson-Seymour Elementary School and Payson-Seymour High School.

== Education ==
The school district is Payson Community Unit School District 1. The comprehensive high school of that district is Payson-Seymour High School.

== Notable people ==
- Mary Frances Leach, educator and chemist
- Anna Kay Scott, medical missionary in India and China
- Ralph Works, pitcher for the Cincinnati Reds and Detroit Tigers
