= Loraine, Illinois =

- Village
- Location of Loraine in Adams County, Illinois.
- Coordinates: 40°09′09″N 91°13′17″W
- Country: US
- State: Illinois
- County: Adams
- Township: Keene
- Founded: c. 1870

Area
  - Total: 0.85 sq mi (2.19 km^{2})
  - Land: 0.85 sq mi (2.19 km^{2})
  - Water: 0 sq mi (0.00 km^{2})
- Elevation: 640 ft (200 m)

Population (2020)
  - Total: 300
  - Estimate (2024): 294 ▼
  - Density: 350/sq mi (140/km^{2})
- Time zone: UTC-6 (CST)
  - Summer (DST): UTC-5 (CDT)
- ZIP code: 62349
- Area code: 217
- FIPS code: 17-44719
- GNIS feature ID: 2398475

Loraine is a village in Adams County, Illinois, United States. The population was 300 at the 2020 census.

== History ==
Loraine was platted in 1870 as a town on the Carthage Branch of the Chicago, Burlington and Quincy Railroad.

== Geography ==
According to the 2021 census gazetteer files, Loraine has a total area of 0.84 square miles (2.18 km^{2}), all land.

== Demographics ==
Historical population
Census	Pop.	Note	%±
1890	327		—
1900	349		6.7%
1910	417		19.5%
1920	527		26.4%
1930	382		−27.5%
1940	346		−9.4%
1950	370		6.9%
1960	303		−18.1%
1970	372		22.8%
1980	382		2.7%
1990	331		−13.4%
2000	363		9.7%
2010	313		−13.8%
2020	300		−4.2%
U.S. Decennial Census

As of the 2020 census there were 300 people, 175 households, and 107 families residing in the village. The population density was 355.45 inhabitants per square mile (137.24/km^{2}). There were 136 housing units at an average density of 161.14 per square mile (62.22/km^{2}). The racial makeup of the village was 92.67% White, 0.33% African American, 0.33% from other races, and 6.33% from two or more races. Hispanic or Latino of any race were 1.67% of the population.

There were 175 households, out of which 23.4% had children under the age of 18 living with them, 52.00% were married couples living together, 4.57% had a female householder with no husband present, and 38.86% were non-families. 27.43% of all households were made up of individuals, and 14.86% had someone living alone who was 65 years of age or older. The average household size was 2.95 and the average family size was 2.35.

The village's age distribution consisted of 20.6% under the age of 18, 3.9% from 18 to 24, 25% from 25 to 44, 21.4% from 45 to 64, and 29.1% who were 65 years of age or older. The median age was 45.7 years. For every 100 females, there were 98.1 males. For every 100 females age 18 and over, there were 92.4 males.

The median income for a household in the village was $49,258, and the median income for a family was $53,125. Males had a median income of $40,441 versus $31,250 for females. The per capita income for the village was $22,935. About 2.8% of families and 11.7% of the population were below the poverty line, including 14.1% of those under age 18 and 3.3% of those age 65 or over.
