= Plainville, Illinois =

- Village
- Location of Plainville in Adams County, Illinois.
- Coordinates: 39°47′05″N 91°10′54″W
- Country: US
- State: Illinois
- County: Adams
- Township: Payson

Area
  - Total: 0.24 sq mi (0.61 km^{2})
  - Land: 0.24 sq mi (0.61 km^{2})
  - Water: 0 sq mi (0.00 km^{2})
- Elevation: 689 ft (210 m)

Population (2020)
  - Total: 271
  - Estimate (2024): 260 ▼
  - Density: 1,200/sq mi (440/km^{2})
- Time zone: UTC-6 (CST)
  - Summer (DST): UTC-5 (CDT)
- ZIP code: 62365
- Area code: 217
- FIPS code: 17-60339
- GNIS feature ID: 2399685

Plainville is a village in Adams County, Illinois, United States. The population was 271 at the 2020 census. It is part of the Quincy, IL–MO Micropolitan Statistical Area.

== History ==
Plainville was originally called Stone's Prairie after Samuel Stone who settled here in 1822.

In the 1860 presidential election campaign, Plainville was the site of a political rally involving around 7,000 people. This resulted in the "Stone's Prairie Riot" on August 25, 1860, at which the Republican Party para-military organization, the "Wide Awakes", confronted armed supporters of the Democratic Party.

== Geography ==
According to the 2021 census gazetteer files, Plainville has a total area of 0.24 square miles (0.62 km^{2}), all land.

== Demographics ==
Historical population
Census	Pop.	Note	%±
1900	296		—
1910	251		−15.2%
1920	245		−2.4%
1930	245		0.0%
1940	249		1.6%
1950	242		−2.8%
1960	227		−6.2%
1970	289		27.3%
1980	289		0.0%
1990	261		−9.7%
2000	248		−5.0%
2010	264		6.5%
2020	271		2.7%
U.S. Decennial Census

As of the 2020 census there were 271 people, 104 households, and 63 families residing in the village. The population density was 1,153.19 inhabitants per square mile (445.25/km^{2}). There were 112 housing units at an average density of 476.60 per square mile (184.02/km^{2}). The racial makeup of the village was 91.88% White, 1.11% Pacific Islander, and 7.01% from two or more races. Hispanic or Latino of any race were 1.48% of the population.

There were 104 households, out of which 27.9% had children under the age of 18 living with them, 50.00% were married couples living together, 5.77% had a female householder with no husband present, and 39.42% were non-families. 32.69% of all households were made up of individuals, and 7.69% had someone living alone who was 65 years of age or older. The average household size was 3.52 and the average family size was 2.74.

The village's age distribution consisted of 26.7% under the age of 18, 3.5% from 18 to 24, 27% from 25 to 44, 28.1% from 45 to 64, and 14.7% who were 65 years of age or older. The median age was 36.8 years. For every 100 females, there were 163.9 males. For every 100 females age 18 and over, there were 137.5 males.

The median income for a household in the village was $50,500, and the median income for a family was $71,875. Males had a median income of $41,786 versus $22,083 for females. The per capita income for the village was $22,803. About 7.9% of families and 17.2% of the population were below the poverty line, including 25.0% of those under age 18 and 2.4% of those age 65 or over.

== Education ==
The school district is Payson Community Unit School District 1. The comprehensive high school of that district is Payson-Seymour High School.
