= Coatsburg, Illinois =

- Village
- Location of Coatsburg in Adams County, Illinois.
- Coordinates: 40°01′57″N 91°09′37″W
- Country: United States
- State: Illinois
- County: Adams
- Township: Honey Creek
- Platted: 1855
- Named for: Robert Coats

Area
  - Total: 0.13 sq mi (0.34 km^{2})
  - Land: 0.13 sq mi (0.34 km^{2})
  - Water: 0 sq mi (0.00 km^{2})
- Elevation: 761 ft (232 m)

Population (2020)
  - Total: 150
  - Estimate (2024): 149 ▼
  - Density: 1,100/sq mi (440/km^{2})
- Time zone: UTC-6 (CST)
  - Summer (DST): UTC-5 (CDT)
- ZIP code: 62325
- Area code: 217
- FIPS code: 17-15261
- GNIS feature ID: 2398591

Coatsburg is a village in Adams County, Illinois, United States. The population was 150 at the 2020 census. It is part of the Quincy, IL–MO Micropolitan Statistical Area.

== History ==
Coatsburg was platted in 1855. A post office called Coatsburgh was established in 1856, and the name was changed to Coatsburg in 1893. The village has the name of Robert Coats, a first settler.

== Geography ==
According to the 2021 census gazetteer files, Coatsburg has a total area of 0.13 square miles (0.34 km^{2}), all land.

== Demographics ==
Historical population
Census	Pop.	Note	%±
1870	192		—
1880	218		13.5%
1890	308		41.3%
1900	321		4.2%
1910	262		−18.4%
1920	185		−29.4%
1930	199		7.6%
1940	189		−5.0%
1950	194		2.6%
1960	178		−8.2%
1970	188		5.6%
1980	258		37.2%
1990	201		−22.1%
2000	226		12.4%
2010	147		−35.0%
2020	150		2.0%
U.S. Decennial Census

As of the 2020 census there were 150 people, 80 households, and 42 families residing in the village. The population density was 1,136.36 inhabitants per square mile (438.75/km^{2}). There were 79 housing units at an average density of 598.48 per square mile (231.07/km^{2}). The racial makeup of the village was 92.00% White, 0.67% from other races, and 7.33% from two or more races. Hispanic or Latino of any race were 2.00% of the population.

There were 80 households, out of which 25.0% had children under the age of 18 living with them, 38.75% were married couples living together, 7.50% had a female householder with no husband present, and 47.50% were non-families. 26.25% of all households were made up of individuals, and 15.00% had someone living alone who was 65 years of age or older. The average household size was 2.79 and the average family size was 2.25.

The village's age distribution consisted of 17.8% under the age of 18, 5.0% from 18 to 24, 37.8% from 25 to 44, 21.1% from 45 to 64, and 18.3% who were 65 years of age or older. The median age was 35.6 years. For every 100 females, there were 130.8 males. For every 100 females age 18 and over, there were 124.2 males.

The median income for a household in the village was $55,714, and the median income for a family was $57,143. Males had a median income of $37,250 versus $23,750 for females. The per capita income for the village was $27,821. About 0.0% of families and 3.4% of the population were below the poverty line, including none of those under age 18 and 6.1% of those age 65 or over.

== Notable people ==
- William S. Gray, educator and literacy advocate, co-author of the Dick and Jane readers
- A. Arnim White, United States Army officer
