= Columbus, Illinois =

- Village
- Location of Columbus in Adams County, Illinois.
- Coordinates: 39°59′18″N 91°08′44″W
- Country: United States
- State: Illinois
- County: Adams
- Townships: Columbus, Gilmer
- Platted: 1835

Area
  - Total: 0.22 sq mi (0.57 km^{2})
  - Land: 0.22 sq mi (0.57 km^{2})
  - Water: 0 sq mi (0.00 km^{2})
- Elevation: 712 ft (217 m)

Population (2020)
  - Total: 114
  - Estimate (2024): 109 ▼
  - Density: 520/sq mi (200/km^{2})
- Time zone: UTC-6 (CST)
  - Summer (DST): UTC-5 (CDT)
- ZIP code: 62320
- Area code: 217
- FIPS code: 17-15846
- GNIS feature ID: 2398605

Columbus is a village in Adams County, Illinois, United States. The population was 114 at the 2020 census. It is part of the Quincy, IL–MO Micropolitan Statistical Area.

== History ==
Columbus was platted in 1835. A post office called Columbus was established in 1837, and remained in operation until 1963.

== Geography ==
According to the 2021 census gazetteer files, Columbus has a total area of 0.22 square miles (0.57 km^{2}), of which 0.22 square miles (0.57 km^{2}) (or 99.10%) is land and 0.00 square miles (0.00 km^{2}) (or 0.90%) is water.

== Demographics ==
Historical population
Census	Pop.	Note	%±
1880	235		—
1890	201		−14.5%
1900	196		−2.5%
1910	134		−31.6%
1920	141		5.2%
1930	116		−17.7%
1940	100		−13.8%
1950	83		−17.0%
1960	109		31.3%
1970	131		20.2%
1980	92		−29.8%
1990	88		−4.3%
2000	112		27.3%
2010	99		−11.6%
2020	114		15.2%
U.S. Decennial Census

As of the 2020 census there were 114 people, 32 households, and 21 families residing in the village. The population density was 515.84 inhabitants per square mile (199.17/km^{2}). There were 46 housing units at an average density of 208.14 per square mile (80.36/km^{2}). The racial makeup of the village was 92.11% White, 1.75% African American, and 6.14% from two or more races. Hispanic or Latino of any race were 5.26% of the population.

There were 32 households, out of which 53.1% had children under the age of 18 living with them, 56.25% were married couples living together, 9.38% had a female householder with no husband present, and 34.38% were non-families. 34.38% of all households were made up of individuals, and 15.63% had someone living alone who was 65 years of age or older. The average household size was 3.24 and the average family size was 2.50.

The village's age distribution consisted of 26.3% under the age of 18, 15.0% from 18 to 24, 32.6% from 25 to 44, 15.1% from 45 to 64, and 11.3% who were 65 years of age or older. The median age was 36.3 years. For every 100 females, there were 86.0 males. For every 100 females age 18 and over, there were 59.5 males.

The median income for a household in the village was $63,750, and the median income for a family was $90,417. Males had a median income of $57,083 versus $15,000 for females. The per capita income for the village was $23,494. About 4.8% of families and 6.3% of the population were below the poverty line, including none of those under age 18 or those age 65 or over.
