= Fowler, Illinois =

- Unincorporated community
- Location of Fowler within Illinois Fowler, Illinois (the United States)
- Coordinates: 40°00′32″N 91°15′28″W
- Country: United States
- State: Illinois
- County: Adams
- Township: Gilmer
- Founded: 1857
- Founded by: Edward H. Fowler
- Named after: Edward H. Fowler

Area
  - Total: 0.14 sq mi (0.35 km^{2})
  - Land: 0.14 sq mi (0.35 km^{2})
  - Water: 0 sq mi (0.00 km^{2})
- Elevation: 732 ft (223 m)

Population (2020)
  - Total: 154
  - Density: 1,142.1/sq mi (440.95/km^{2})
- Time zone: UTC-6 (CST)
  - Summer (DST): UTC-5 (CDT)
- FIPS code: 17-27377
- GNIS feature ID: 2804085

Fowler is an unincorporated community and census-designated place in Gilmer Township, Adams County, Illinois, United States and is located near Quincy. As of the 2020 census, Fowler had a population of 154. It is part of the Quincy, IL–MO Micropolitan Statistical Area. U.S. Route 24 passes through the center of town as well as the Burlington Northern and Santa Fe Railroad. Interstate 172 begins two miles west of Fowler.

== History ==
Fowler had its start in the 1850s when the railroad was extended to that point. A post office called Fowler's Station was established in 1857, and the name was changed to Fowler in 1869.

An 1876 map of Fowler in Adams County, Illinois

== Geography ==
According to the 2021 census gazetteer files, Fowler has a total area of 0.14 square miles (0.36 km^{2}), all land.

== Demographics ==
Historical population
Census	Pop.	Note	%±
2020	154		—
U.S. Decennial Census

Fowler first appeared as a census designated place in the 2020 U.S. census.

As of the 2020 census there were 154 people, 44 households, and 18 families residing in the CDP. The population density was 1,140.74 inhabitants per square mile (440.44/km^{2}). There were 70 housing units at an average density of 518.52 per square mile (200.20/km^{2}). The racial makeup of the CDP was 87.01% White, 0.65% Native American, 1.95% Asian, 1.30% from other races, and 9.09% from two or more races. Hispanic or Latino of any race were 5.84% of the population.
