= Adams County, Illinois =

County in Illinois, United States

- County
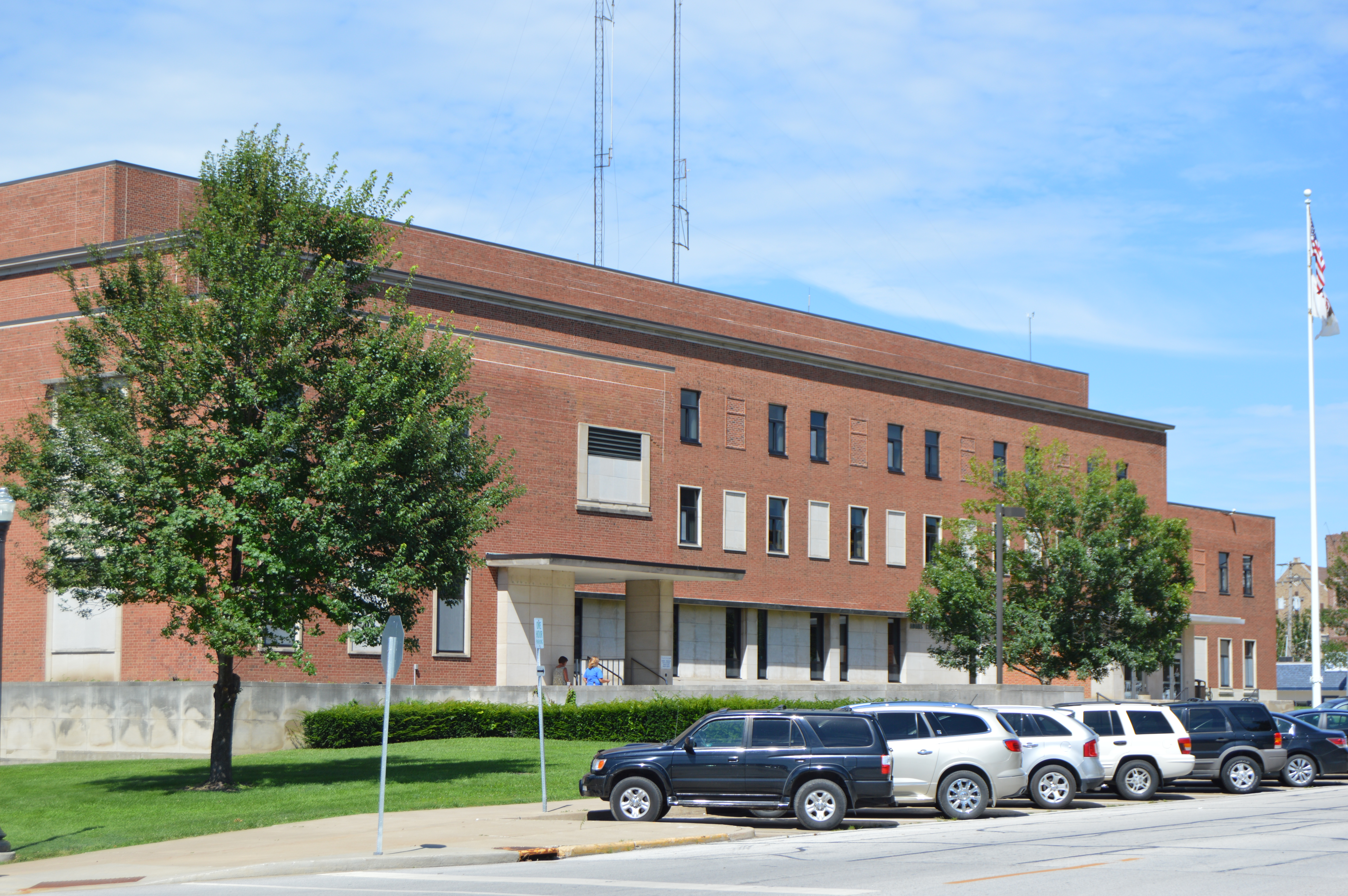
- Adams County Courthouse

- Seal

- Location within the U.S. state of Illinois
- Coordinates: 39°59′N 91°11′W
- Country: United States
- State: Illinois
- Founded: 1825
- Named for: John Quincy Adams
- Seat: Quincy
- Largest city: Quincy

Area
  - Total: 871 sq mi (2,260 km^{2})
  - Land: 855 sq mi (2,210 km^{2})
  - Water: 16 sq mi (41 km^{2}) 1.9%

Population (2020)
  - Total: 65,737
  - Estimate (2025): 64,267 ▼
  - Density: 76.9/sq mi (29.7/km^{2})
- Time zone: UTC−6 (Central)
  - Summer (DST): UTC−5 (CDT)
- Congressional district: 15th
- Website: www.adamscountyil.gov

Adams County is the westernmost county in the U.S. state of Illinois. As of the 2020 United States census, the population was 65,737. Its county seat is Quincy. Adams County is part of the Quincy, IL–MO Micropolitan Statistical Area.

== History ==
Adams County was formed in 1825 out of Pike County. Its name is in honor of the sixth President of the United States, John Quincy Adams.

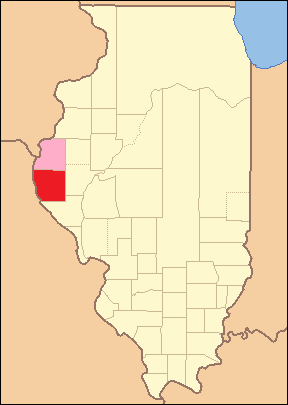
When it was created, Hancock County was temporarily attached to Adams until it could organize a county government.

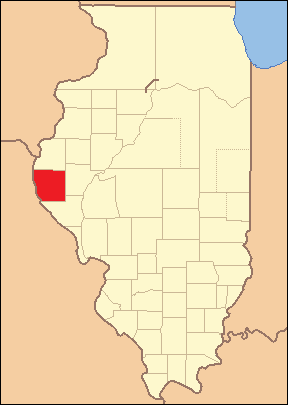
Adams County reduced to its current borders in 1829.

== Geography ==
Quincy, Illinois

Climate chart (precipitation, max. and min. temperature)
J	F	M	A	M	J	J	A	S	O	N	D
1.4 34 16	1.7 40 21	2.9 52 30	3.5 65 41	4.6 75 51	3.3 84 61	3.9 88 66	3.1 86 63	3.5 78 55	2.5 66 43	3.1 51 33	2.2 38 21
- █ Average max. and min. temperatures in °F
- █ Precipitation totals in inches
- Source: The Weather Channel
Metric conversion
J	F	M	A	M	J	J	A	S	O	N	D
35 1 −9	44 4 −6	74 11 −1	88 18 5	117 24 11	83 29 16	99 31 19	78 30 17	88 26 13	64 19 6	79 11 1	56 3 −6
- █ Average max. and min. temperatures in °C
- █ Precipitation totals in mm

According to the U.S. Census Bureau, the county has a total area of 871 square miles (2,260 km^{2}), of which 855 square miles (2,210 km^{2}) is land and 16 square miles (41 km^{2}) (1.9%) is water.

=== Adjacent counties ===
- Hancock County - north
- Brown County - east
- Schuyler County - east
- Pike County - south
- Marion County, Missouri - west
- Lewis County, Missouri - west

=== Public transit ===
- Quincy Transit Lines
- Quincy station
- Burlington Trailways
- List of intercity bus stops in Illinois

=== Major highways ===
- I-172
- US 24
- US 36
- IL 57
- IL 61
- IL 94
- IL 96
- IL 104
- IL 110 (CKC)

=== National protected area ===
- Great River National Wildlife Refuge (part)

=== Climate and weather ===
In recent years, average temperatures in the county seat of Quincy have ranged from a low of 16 °F (−9 °C) in January to a high of 88 °F (31 °C) in July, although a record low of −21 °F (−29 °C) was recorded in January 1979 and a record high of 105 °F (41 °C) was recorded in July 2005. Average monthly precipitation ranged from 1.36 inches (35 mm) in January to 4.61 inches (117 mm) in May.

== Demographics ==
2000 Census Age Pyramid for Adams County.

Historical population
Census	Pop.	Note	%±
1830	2,186		—
1840	14,476		562.2%
1850	26,508		83.1%
1860	41,323		55.9%
1870	56,362		36.4%
1880	59,135		4.9%
1890	61,888		4.7%
1900	67,058		8.4%
1910	64,588		−3.7%
1920	62,188		−3.7%
1930	62,784		1.0%
1940	65,229		3.9%
1950	64,690		−0.8%
1960	68,467		5.8%
1970	70,861		3.5%
1980	71,622		1.1%
1990	66,090		−7.7%
2000	68,277		3.3%
2010	67,103		−1.7%
2020	65,737		−2.0%
2025 (est.)	64,267	▼	−2.2%
U.S. Decennial Census; 1790–1960 1900–1990; 1990–2000 2010–2013

=== 2020 census ===
As of the 2020 census, the county had a population of 65,737. The median age was 41.3 years, 22.4% of residents were under the age of 18, and 20.5% of residents were 65 years of age or older. For every 100 females there were 95.8 males, and for every 100 females age 18 and over there were 93.4 males age 18 and over.

The racial makeup of the county was 89.5% White, 3.8% Black or African American, 0.2% American Indian and Alaska Native, 0.8% Asian, 0.1% Native Hawaiian and Pacific Islander, 0.8% from some other race, and 4.9% from two or more races. Hispanic or Latino residents of any race comprised 2.0% of the population.

66.1% of residents lived in urban areas, while 33.9% lived in rural areas.

There were 27,313 households in the county, of which 27.4% had children under the age of 18 living in them. Of all households, 47.3% were married-couple households, 18.0% were households with a male householder and no spouse or partner present, and 27.2% were households with a female householder and no spouse or partner present. About 31.1% of all households were made up of individuals and 14.0% had someone living alone who was 65 years of age or older.

There were 30,235 housing units, of which 9.7% were vacant. Among occupied housing units, 71.5% were owner-occupied and 28.5% were renter-occupied. The homeowner vacancy rate was 1.8% and the rental vacancy rate was 11.1%.

=== Racial and ethnic composition ===
Adams County, Illinois – Racial and ethnic composition Note: the US Census treats Hispanic/Latino as an ethnic category. This table excludes Latinos from the racial categories and assigns them to a separate category. Hispanics/Latinos may be of any race.
Race / Ethnicity (NH = Non-Hispanic)	Pop 1980	Pop 1990	Pop 2000	Pop 2010	Pop 2020	% 1980	% 1990	% 2000	% 2010	% 2020
White alone (NH)	69,274	63,729	64,611	62,414	58,389	96.72%	96.43%	94.63%	93.01%	88.82%
Black or African American alone (NH)	1,697	1,684	2,077	2,288	2,464	2.37%	2.55%	3.04%	3.41%	3.75%
Native American or Alaska Native alone (NH)	74	97	102	100	92	0.10%	0.15%	0.15%	0.15%	0.14%
Asian alone (NH)	160	247	269	430	500	0.22%	0.37%	0.39%	0.64%	0.76%
Native Hawaiian or Pacific Islander alone (NH)	x	x	8	12	33	x	x	0.01%	0.02%	0.05%
Other race alone (NH)	114	68	45	75	223	0.16%	0.10%	0.07%	0.11%	0.34%
Mixed race or Multiracial (NH)	x	x	598	1,008	2,749	x	x	0.88%	1.50%	4.18%
Hispanic or Latino (any race)	303	265	567	776	1,287	0.42%	0.40%	0.83%	1.16%	1.96%
Total	71,622	66,090	68,277	67,103	65,737	100.00%	100.00%	100.00%	100.00%	100.00%

=== 2006–2010 American Community Survey ===
The median income for a household in the county was $55,052 and the median income for a family was $72,091. Males had a median income of $41,852 versus $29,404 for females. The per capita income for the county was $31,035. About 9.4% of families and 12.5% of the population were below the poverty line, including 17.7% of those under age 18 and 9.9% of those age 65 or over.

== Communities ==
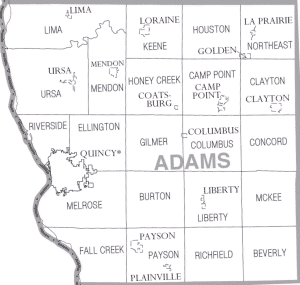
Adams County, Illinois.

Community	Community type	Population	Total Area	Water Area	Land Area	Pop. Density
Camp Point	village	1,121	1.27	0.00	1.27	885.47
Clayton	village	639	0.89	0.01	0.88	722.85
Coatsburg	village	150	0.13	0.00	0.13	1,136.36
Columbus	village	114	0.22	0.00	0.22	520.55
Golden	village	648	0.64	0.00	0.64	1,009.35
La Prairie	village	42	0.19	0.00	0.19	217.62
Liberty	village	543	0.39	0.00	0.39	1,388.75
Lima	village	148	0.14	0.00	0.14	1,096.30
Loraine	village	300	0.84	0.00	0.84	355.45
Mendon	village	872	0.86	0.00	0.86	1,017.50
Payson	village	1,025	1.17	0.00	1.17	876.07
Plainville	village	271	0.23	0.00	0.23	1,153.19
Quincy (seat)	city	39,463	15.81	0.04	15.77	2,503.20
Ursa	village	609	0.69	0.00	0.69	882.61
Adams County	county	65,737	871	16	855	75

=== Census-designated places ===
- Adams
- Beverly
- Bloomfield
- Burton
- Fall Creek
- Fowler
- Kingston
- Marblehead
- Marcelline
- Meyer
- Paloma
- Richfield

=== Unincorporated communities ===
- Bigneck
- Chatton
- Kellerville
- North Quincy
- Spring Valley
- Woodville

=== Townships ===
Adams County is divided into twenty-three townships:

- Beverly
- Burton
- Camp Point
- Clayton
- Columbus
- Concord
- Ellington
- Fall Creek
- Gilmer
- Honey Creek
- Houston
- Keene
- Liberty
- Lima
- McKee
- Melrose
- Mendon
- Northeast
- Payson
- Quincy
- Richfield
- Riverside
- Ursa

== Politics ==
United States presidential election results for Adams County, Illinois
Year	Republican		Democratic		Third party(ies)	
Year	No.	%	No.	%	No.	%
1892	6,081	41.98%	7,746	53.48%	657	4.54%
1896	8,447	50.26%	8,025	47.75%	336	2.00%
1900	8,047	46.81%	8,844	51.44%	301	1.75%
1904	7,277	49.06%	6,149	41.45%	1,408	9.49%
1908	7,233	44.34%	8,294	50.84%	787	4.82%
1912	3,780	26.50%	6,952	48.74%	3,531	24.76%
1916	11,858	44.23%	14,268	53.22%	682	2.54%
1920	12,852	57.07%	7,222	32.07%	2,447	10.87%
1924	9,985	40.92%	8,628	35.35%	5,791	23.73%
1928	15,590	53.59%	13,215	45.42%	288	0.99%
1932	10,134	32.00%	21,098	66.62%	437	1.38%
1936	13,114	39.18%	18,857	56.33%	1,502	4.49%
1940	18,480	50.86%	17,361	47.78%	492	1.35%
1944	15,564	52.87%	13,733	46.65%	142	0.48%
1948	14,329	48.67%	14,960	50.81%	152	0.52%
1952	19,652	59.60%	13,301	40.34%	21	0.06%
1956	19,569	63.12%	11,402	36.78%	32	0.10%
1960	18,674	55.70%	14,827	44.22%	28	0.08%
1964	13,993	43.30%	18,321	56.70%	0	0.00%
1968	17,444	54.33%	11,521	35.88%	3,143	9.79%
1972	20,731	69.46%	9,055	30.34%	60	0.20%
1976	18,189	59.67%	11,926	39.12%	370	1.21%
1980	19,842	62.17%	10,606	33.23%	1,469	4.60%
1984	20,225	65.99%	10,336	33.72%	88	0.29%
1988	15,831	53.29%	13,768	46.34%	111	0.37%
1992	13,529	42.84%	11,748	37.20%	6,302	19.96%
1996	13,836	48.70%	11,336	39.90%	3,239	11.40%
2000	17,331	57.56%	12,197	40.51%	581	1.93%
2004	20,834	66.19%	10,511	33.39%	132	0.42%
2008	18,711	60.55%	11,794	38.17%	397	1.28%
2012	20,416	66.51%	9,648	31.43%	633	2.06%
2016	22,790	70.54%	7,676	23.76%	1,844	5.71%
2020	24,220	72.24%	8,633	25.75%	674	2.01%
2024	23,161	72.61%	8,111	25.43%	628	1.97%

Adams County, Illinois
Position	Person	Party
Circuit Clerk	Lori Geschwandner	Democratic
County Clerk	Ryan Niekamp	Republican
Coroner	Scott Graham	Republican
Sheriff	Anthony Grootens	Republican
State's Attorney	Gary Farha	Republican
Regional Superintendent	Jill Reis	Republican
Treasurer	Bryden Cory	Republican

Adams County, positioned in a primarily rural section of Illinois, is culturally isolated from Chicago, and therefore is somewhat more conservative than the state's northeastern corner. Quincy, the county seat, is home to a high number of socially conservative Catholics and likewise is the home to the campus of Quincy University, a private Catholic liberal arts college, and the Western Catholic Union.

The county is part of the historic belt of German settlement extending into the Missouri Rhineland. Since it was antagonistic to the Yankee northeast of Illinois, it voted solidly Democratic until 1892. After being a swing county in the first half of the twentieth century, Adams County has been a Republican stronghold. It has gone Republican in all but four presidential elections since 1920, all but one of which was a 400-vote Democratic landslide. The county last supported a Democrat in 1964, when it voted for Lyndon Johnson. The county regularly supports the Republicans at the state level as well; it has not supported a Democrat for Governor of Illinois since Adlai Stevenson II in 1948. Additionally, five of the six countywide elected officials in Adams County are Republicans, with a Democrat holding the position of Circuit Clerk. Notably, while it voted for Barack Obama in his 2004 Senate campaign, he lost it by wide margins in both of his presidential bids.

The county is part of Illinois's 15th congressional district, currently represented by Republican Mary Miller. For the Illinois House of Representatives, the county is located in the 94th district, represented by Republican Randy Frese. The county is located in the 47th district of the Illinois Senate, represented by Republican Jil Tracy.

== Education ==
=== Unified school districts ===
School districts covering sections of the county include:

- Central Community Unit School District 3
- Griggsville-Perry Community Unit School District 4
- Liberty Community Unit School District 2
- Mendon Community Unit School District 4
- Payson Community Unit School District 1
- Quincy Public School District 172
- Southeastern Community Unit School District 337
- Western Community Unit School District 12

=== Private schools ===
- Blessed Sacrament Catholic School
- Chaddock School
- Quincy Christian School
- Quincy Notre Dame High School
- St. Dominic Catholic School
- St. Francis Solanus Catholic School
- St. James Lutheran School
- St. Peter Catholic School

=== Colleges and universities ===
- Blessing-Rieman College of Nursing and Health Sciences
- John Wood Community College
- Quincy University

== Attractions ==
- Adams County Fair
- Bayview Bridge
- Burton Cave
- Fall Creek Scenic Park
- Golden Windmill
- John Wood Mansion
- Saukenauk Scout Reservation
- Siloam Springs State Park
- Spirit Knob Winery
- Villa Katharine
- Wavering Park

== See also ==
- National Register of Historic Places listings in Adams County, Illinois
