= Kellerville, Illinois =

- Unincorporated community
- Location within Illinois Location within the United States
- Coordinates: 39°55′52″N 90°56′04″W
- Country: United States
- State: Illinois
- County: Adams
- Elevation: 722 ft (220 m)
- Time zone: UTC-6 (Central (CST))
  - Summer (DST): UTC-5 (CDT)
- Area code: 217
- GNIS feature ID: 411361

Kellerville is an unincorporated community in Concord Township, Adams County, Illinois, United States. Kellerville is south of Clayton and north of Siloam Springs State Park.
