= Central Community Unit School District 3 =

School district in Illinois, United States

Address
- 2110 Highway 94 North Camp Point, Illinois, 62320; United States

District information
- Superintendent: Erica Smith

Other information
- Website: Official website

Central Community Unit School District 3 is a unified school district located near Camp Point, a village located in Adams County, Illinois. In its entirety, Central Community Unit School District 3 is composed of Central Elementary Grade School, Central Middle School, Central Junior High School, and Central High School altogether. The current superintendent is Erica Smith. The mascot of the district schools is the panther.

Central High School offers a variety of activities, ranging from National Honor Society to a varsity Scholastic Bowl team. The district's junior high school also sports extracurricular activities, including FCCLA and a Yearbook committee.
