= Payson Community Unit School District 1 =

Unified school district in Illinois, United States

Location
- Payson, Illinois; United States
- Coordinates: 39°48′58.30″N 91°14′51.28″W

District information
- Type: Unified school district
- Grades: K to 12
- Superintendent: Dr. Donna Veile
- NCES District ID: 1730990

Students and staff
- Enrollment: 599 (2007-08)
- Faculty: 41.0 (on an FTE basis)
- Student–teacher ratio: 14.6
- District mascot: Indian
- Colors: Royal blue and White

Other information
- Website: www.cusd1.org

Payson Community Unit School District 1 is a unified school district composed of Seymour Elementary School and Payson-Seymour High School, and is centrally based in Payson, Illinois, a village in Adams County; it serves Payson and the surrounding municipalities. The current superintendent is Dr. Donna Veile. The principal of Seymour High is Shelly Sheffler and the principal of Seymour Elementary is Julie Molidor The athletics teams of Payson Community Unit School District 1 are known as the Indians and Lady Indians, for the boys and girls respectively.

Seymour High School goes by the nickname "SHS"; its school colors are blue and white.

The district is in Adams County, and includes the municipalities of Payson and Plainville, the census-designated places of Burton, Fall Creek, and Richfield, and most of the Adams CDP.
