= Griggsville-Perry Community Unit School District 4 =

School district in Pike County, Illinois, United States

Address
- 202 North Stanford Street Griggsville, Illinois, 62340; United States

District information
- Type: Public
- Grades: PreK–12
- NCES District ID: 1717790

Students and staff
- Students: 343 (2020–2021)

Other information
- Website: www.griggsvilleperry.org

Griggsville-Perry Community Unit School District 4 is a unified school district located in Griggsville, one of the largest cities in Pike County, Illinois. The consolidated district is composed of three schools; Griggsville-Perry Primary School educates kindergarteners and the first three grades, Griggsville-Perry Middle School, which is the main facility for grades fifth through sixth, and Griggsville-Perry High School. The current superintendent of the school is Janet Gladu, while the principals of the schools of Griggsville-Perry Community Unit School District 4 are Andrea Allen (principal of both Griggsville-Perry Primary School and Griggsville-Perry High School) and Pollee Craven, principal of Griggsville-Perry Middle School. The mascot of Griggsville-Perry Community Unit School District 4 is the tornado.

The athletics departments of Griggsville-Perry CUSD and Pikeland Community Unit School District 10 purportedly operate in conjunction with one another.
