= Ziliak =

Ziliak may refer to:

- James Ziliak, American business economist
- Stephen Ziliak, American business economist
