= Quincy, Illinois =

- City
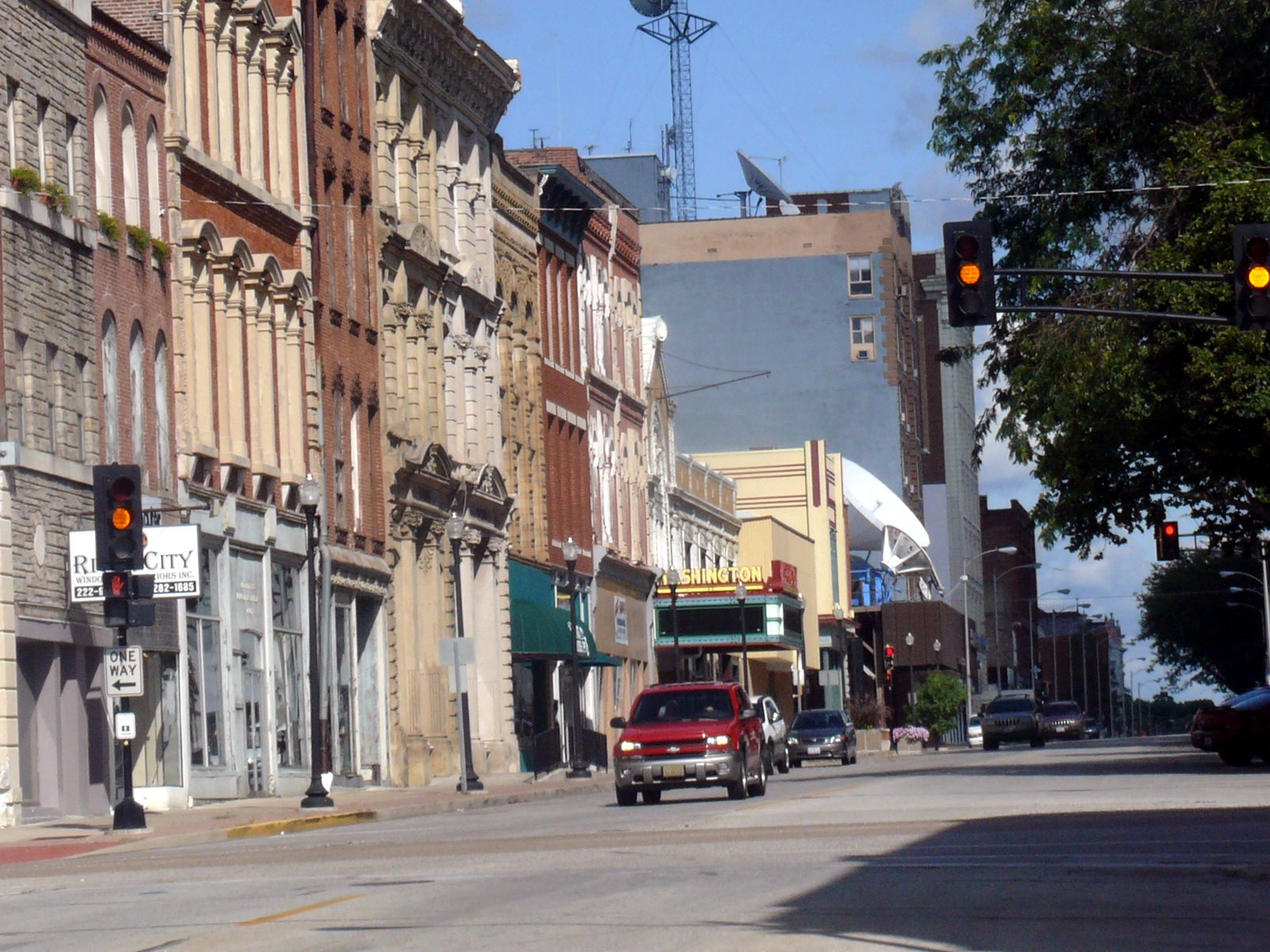
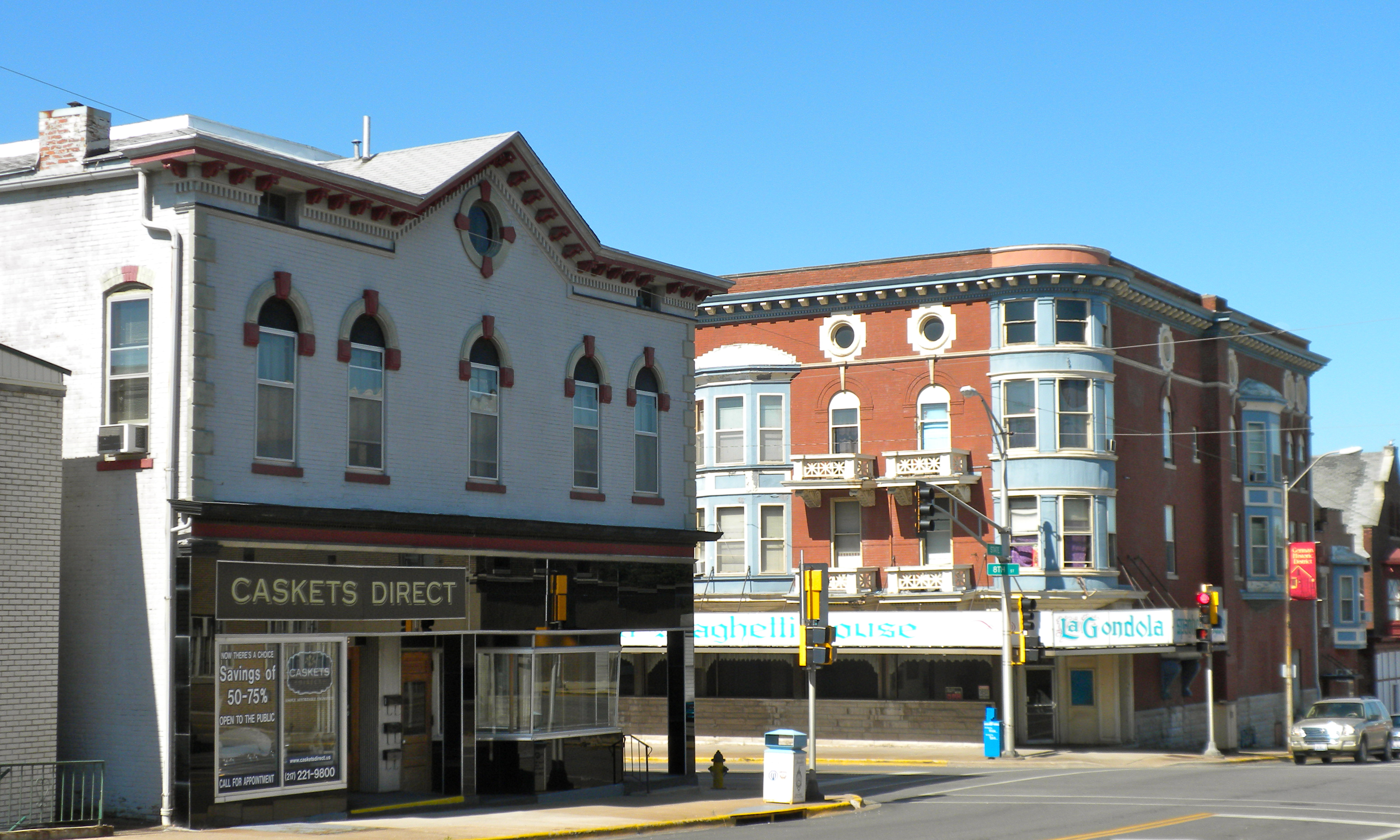
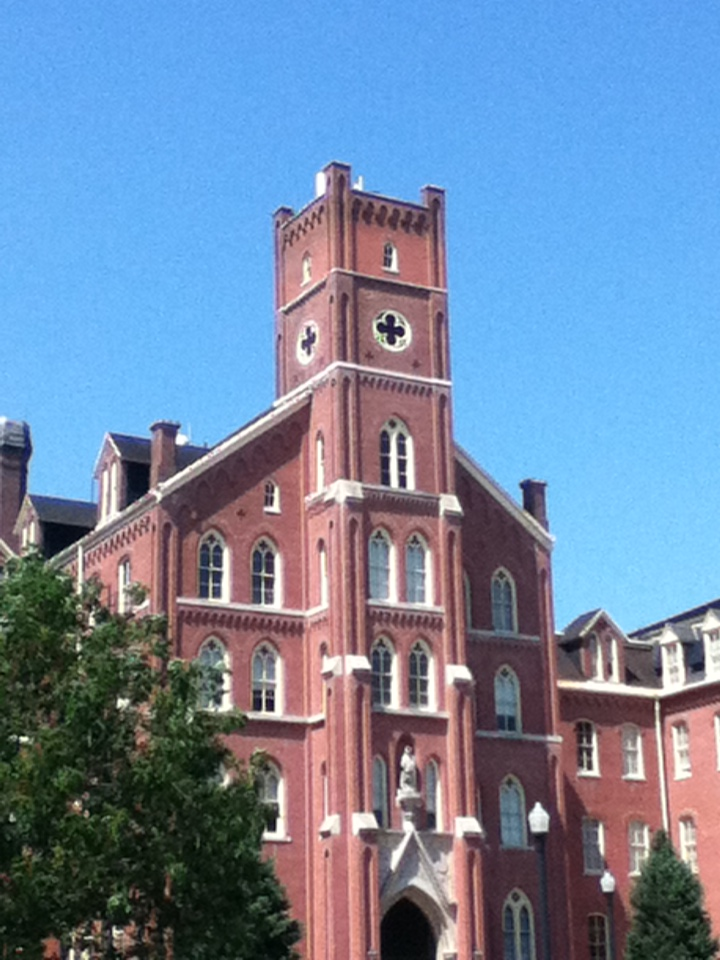
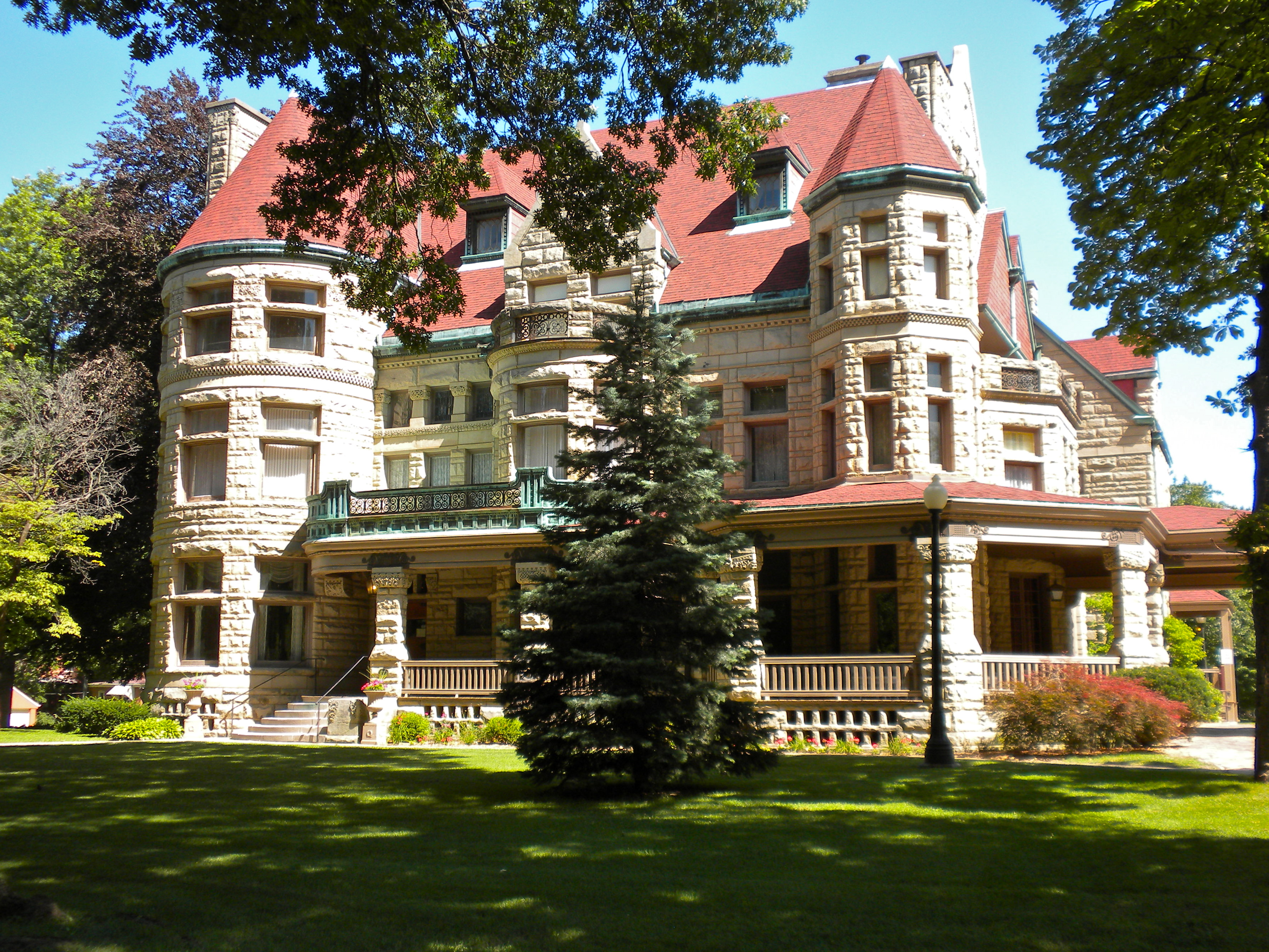
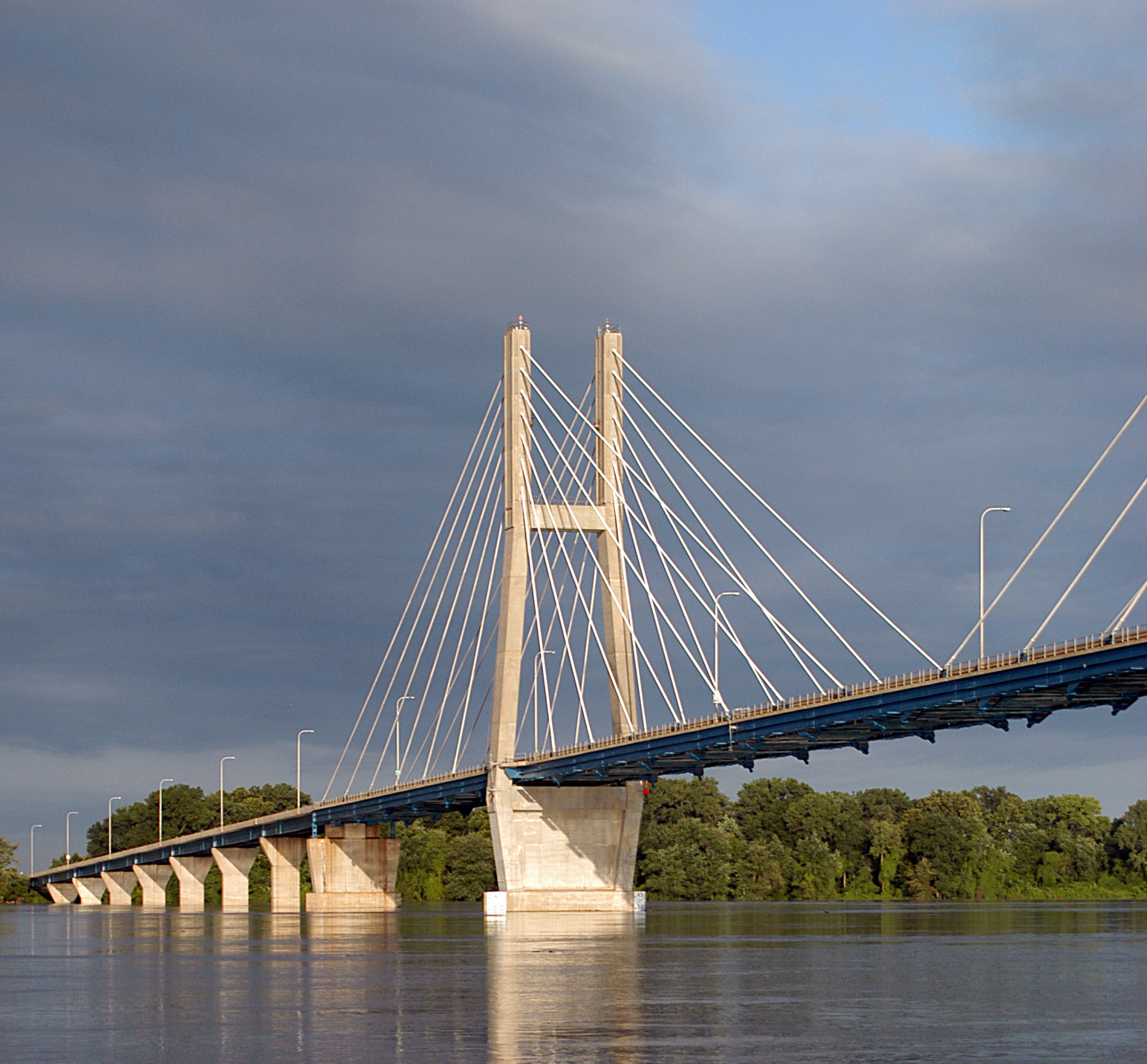
- Downtown Quincy South Side German Historic District Quincy University Quincy Museum Bayview Bridge

- Seal
- Nickname: Gem City
- Interactive map of Quincy, Illinois
- Location within Illinois Location within the United States
- Coordinates: 39°55′52″N 91°22′20″W
- Country: US
- State: Illinois
- County: Adams
- Settled: 1819
- Incorporated (town): 1834
- Incorporated (city): 1870

Government
  - Type: Mayor–council
  - Mayor: Linda Moore (I)

Area
  - City: 15.81 sq mi (40.94 km^{2})
  - Land: 15.76 sq mi (40.83 km^{2})
  - Water: 0.042 sq mi (0.11 km^{2})
- Elevation: 633 ft (193 m)

Population (2020)
  - City: 39,463
  - Estimate (2024): 38,786 ▼
  - Density: 2,503/sq mi (966.5/km^{2})
  - Metro: 75,546
- Time zone: UTC−6 (CST)
  - Summer (DST): UTC−5 (CDT)
- ZIP codes: 62301, 62302, 62303, 62304, 62305, 62306
- Area codes: 217, 447
- FIPS code: 17-001-62380
- GNIS feature ID: 2396301
- Website: www.quincyil.gov

Quincy (/ˈkwɪnsi/ KWIN-see) is a city in Adams County, Illinois, United States, and its county seat. Located on the Mississippi River, the population was 39,463 as of the 2020 census, down from 40,633 in 2010. The Quincy micropolitan area had 114,649 residents.

Known as Illinois's "Gem City", Quincy was a thriving transportation center as riverboats and rail service linked the city to many destinations west and along the river during the 19th century. It was Illinois' second-largest city, surpassing Peoria in 1870. The city has several historic districts, including the Downtown Quincy Historic District and the South Side German Historic District, which display the architecture of Quincy's many German immigrants from the late 19th century.

== History ==
=== Early history ===
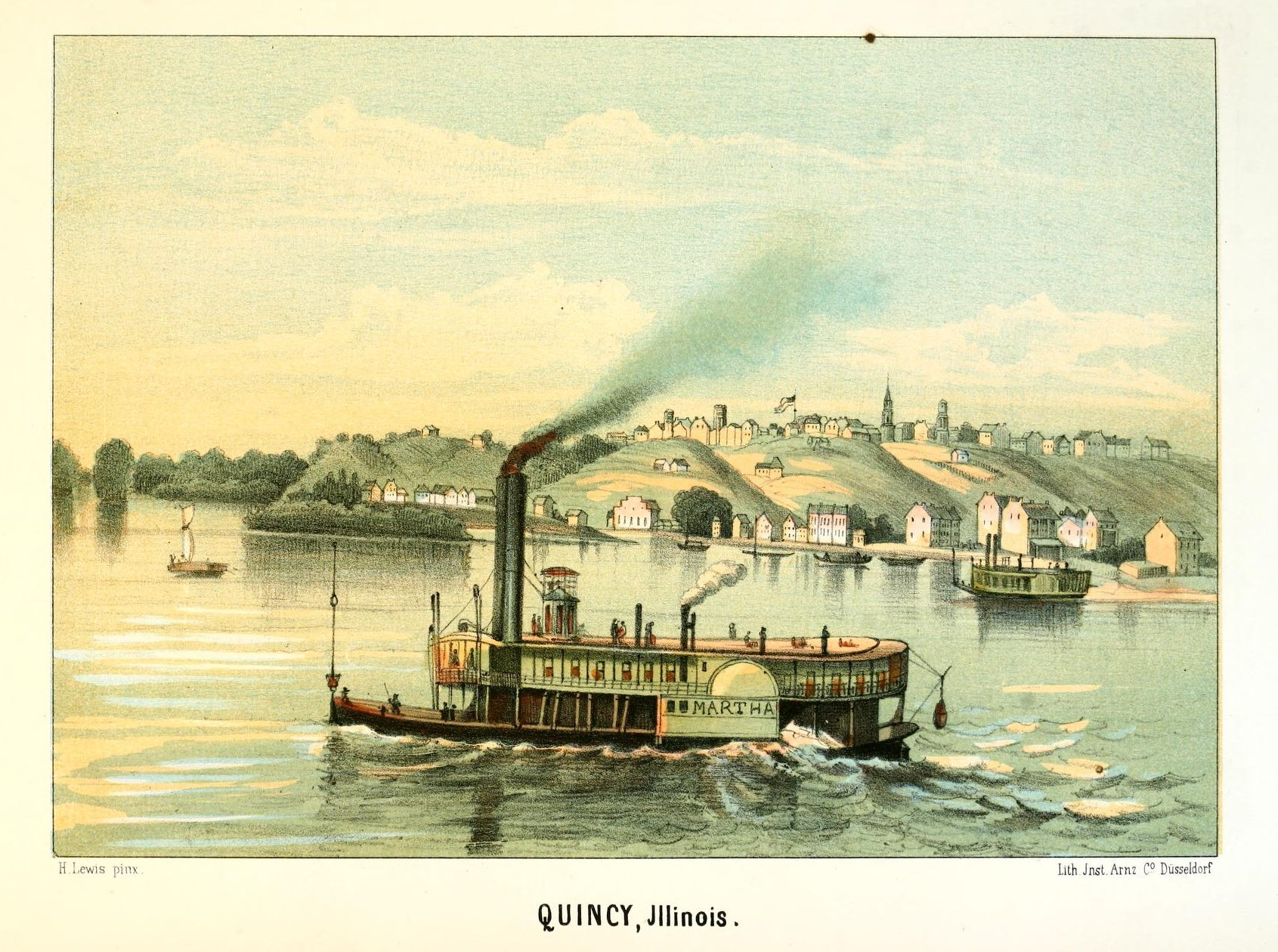
Quincy in 1848 by Henry Lewis

Quincy's location along the Mississippi River has attracted settlers for centuries. The French became the first European presence to colonize the region, after Louis Jolliet, Jacques Marquette, and the La Salle Expeditions explored the Upper Mississippi River Valley. Fur goods became a valuable commodity of the region, and European explorers and merchants alike were attracted to the prospects of the growing fur trade of the North American frontier. The Mississippi River, acting as a superhighway for transporting goods downstream, became the area's most vital transportation asset.

Following the events of the Seven Years' War, which ended in 1763, Great Britain took control of New France, and the area that is now Illinois became part of the Indian Reserve. After the American Revolutionary War a few decades later, the area became part of the Northwest Territory of the United States, and eventually the State of Illinois in 1818.

=== 19th century ===
After the War of 1812, the American government granted military tracts to veterans as a means to help populate the West. Peter Flinn, having acquired the land from veteran Mark McGowan for his military service in 1819, ended up selling 160 acres (0.65 km^{2}) of land acquisitions to Moravia, New York native John Wood for $60 (~$1,787 in 2025). John Wood later founded Quincy, which at the time was coined Bluffs, Illinois.

In 1825, Bluffs renamed their community Quincy and became the seat of government for Adams County, both named after newly elected President John Quincy Adams. In addition, they originally named the town square John Square until eventually changing its name to Washington Square. In December 1830, Peter Felt, who had recently arrived with his family from New Hampshire, and others held the first service at what would become the first congregational churches in the state. In June 1834, Quincy was incorporated, with Archibald Williams, Joseph T. Holmes, S. W. Rogers, Levi Wells, and Michael Mast elected as trustees. Quincy incorporated as a city in 1840, with Ebenezer Moore elected as its first mayor.

In 1837, following the signing of Missouri Executive Order 44, which called for the expulsion of Mormons from Missouri and the extermination of those who refused, many members of the Church of Jesus Christ of Latter-day Saints fled persecution in Missouri and found shelter in Quincy. Despite being vastly outnumbered by Mormon refugees, residents provided food and lodging for the displaced people. Joseph Smith then led members of the Church of Jesus Christ of Latter-day Saints 40 miles (64 km) upstream to Nauvoo, Illinois, in hopes of finding a permanent home. Also in 1838, Quincy sheltered the Potawatomi tribe as they were forcibly relocated from Indiana to Kansas.

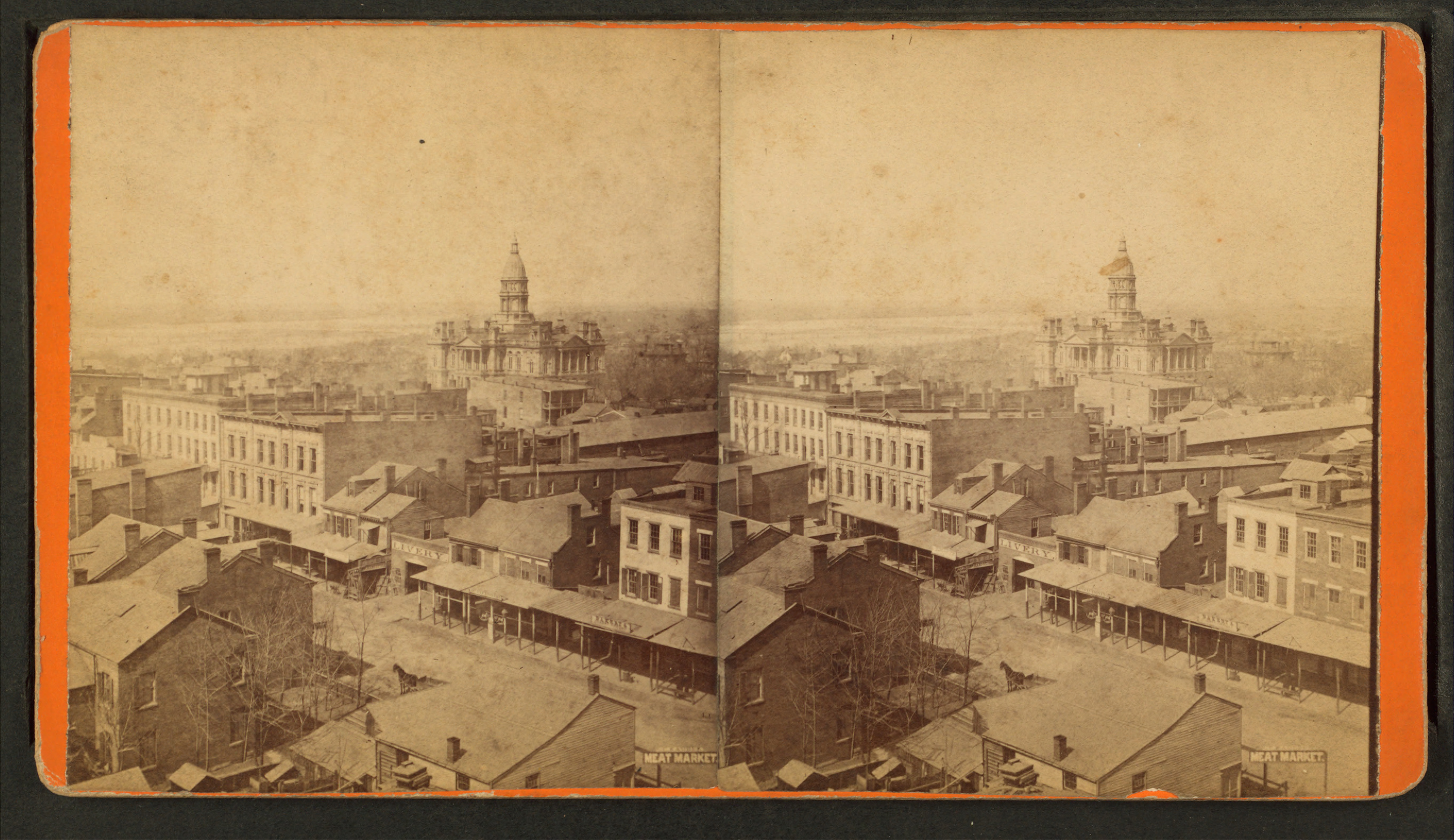
19th century view of Quincy Courthouse by John Sanftleben

The 1850s and 1860s brought increased prosperity to Quincy. Steamboats and railroads began linking Quincy to places west, making the city a frequent destination for immigrants. The founding of the Chicago, Burlington and Quincy Railroad in 1855, and the construction of the Quincy Rail Bridge, were major drivers for creating a transportation hub in the region to further commerce. It is during this time that the city's population grew enormously, from just under 7,000 residents in 1850 to 24,000 by 1870, helping Quincy surpass Peoria in becoming the second-largest city in the state (at that time).

One famous former resident of Quincy is George E. Pickett. The future Confederate general came to Quincy to live as a young man, and learn the law, from his uncle Alexander Johnson in the 1840s. Johnson was acquainted with Abraham Lincoln, and Pickett and Lincoln may have even met each other in Quincy.

In 1860, Quincy founder and Lieutenant Governor John Wood inherited the governorship after William H. Bissell died while in office. At the time, he was overseeing business interests and the construction of his mansion. The Illinois legislature allowed him to stay in Quincy during his tenure, effectively making Quincy a "second" capitol for the state. His absence from the official governor's office in Springfield provided Abraham Lincoln a space for planning his presidential run.

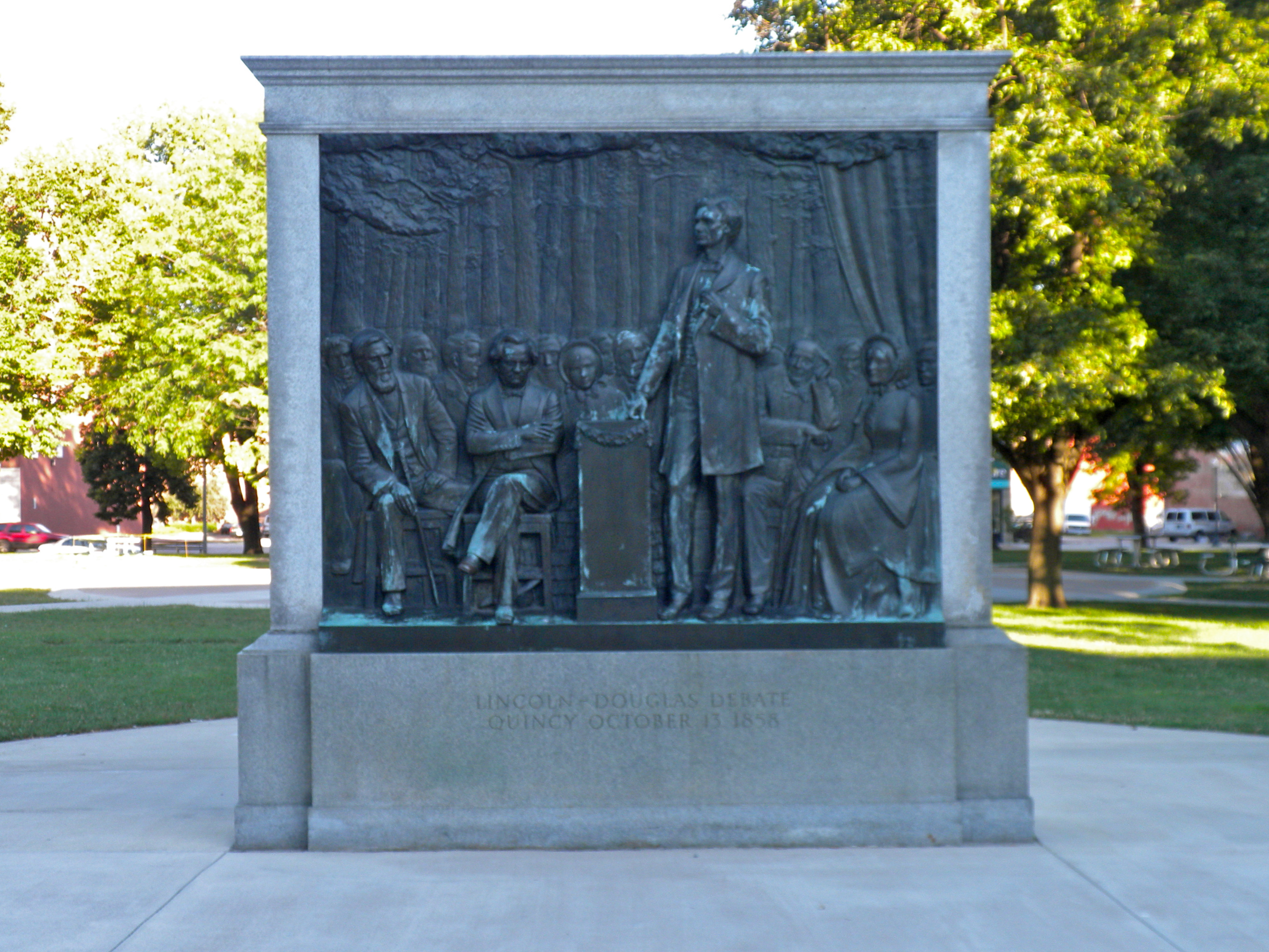
A mural to the 1858 Lincoln–Douglas debates in Quincy

Slavery was a major religious and social issue in Quincy's early years. The Illinois city's location, separated only by the Mississippi River from the slave state of Missouri, which was a hotbed of political controversy on the issue, made Quincy itself a hotbed of political controversy on slavery. Richard Eells, who was a staunch abolitionist, built his home in Quincy in 1835 and sheltered formerly enslaved people who had escaped and were on their way to Chicago. His home became a major stop on the Underground Railroad. The divide over slavery climaxed in 1858, when Quincy hosted the sixth Senatorial debate by U.S. Senator Stephen A. Douglas and his challenger, Abraham Lincoln. With a crowd of 12,000 in attendance, Quincy was the largest community at which Lincoln and Douglas debated.

Lincoln and Douglas again confronted each other in the 1860 Presidential election and the resulting campaign again divided Quincy and the surrounding region. Lincoln enthusiasts and Quincy's chapter of the Republican Party's para-military organization Wide Awakes, while en route to a political rally in Plainville, marched upon nearby Payson, which was a community predominantly filled with Douglas supporters. Although a confrontation was avoided while en route to Plainville, Douglas supporters shot upon the Wide Awakes on their journey back to Quincy, resulting in a skirmish known as the Stone Prairie Riots.

An 1876 map of Quincy within Adams County.

The Civil War brought increasing prosperity to Quincy. Although the battles took place far from the city, Quincy was the organization site for several Illinois volunteer work infantry regiments, including the Union Army's 16th, 50th, 78th, 84th, 119th, 137th, 138th, and 151st. Following the Reconstruction Era, Quincy was selected as the location for Illinois' first Veteran's Home in 1886.

==== Immigration ====
Early immigrants to Quincy came predominately from the Upper South but were followed later by those from New England, seeking better land. They brought with them progressive values, such as public education and abolitionism. Starting in the 1840s, migrants from Germany settled in Quincy to escape revolutions among the German provinces and conflicts between the European powers. German migrants mainly lived in close proximity to one another and settled predominantly in the southern parts of the city, influencing much of Quincy's historic architecture and creating the South Side German Historic District. Collectively, the south side of Quincy became known as Calftown, due to the fact that nearly every household possessed a cow. Among the notable German-Americans from Quincy's Southside was Louise Maertz (1837–1918), a nurse during the American Civil War.

In 1860, a group of Franciscan friars founded the St. Francis Solanus College, which later developed into Quincy University.

=== 20th and 21st centuries ===
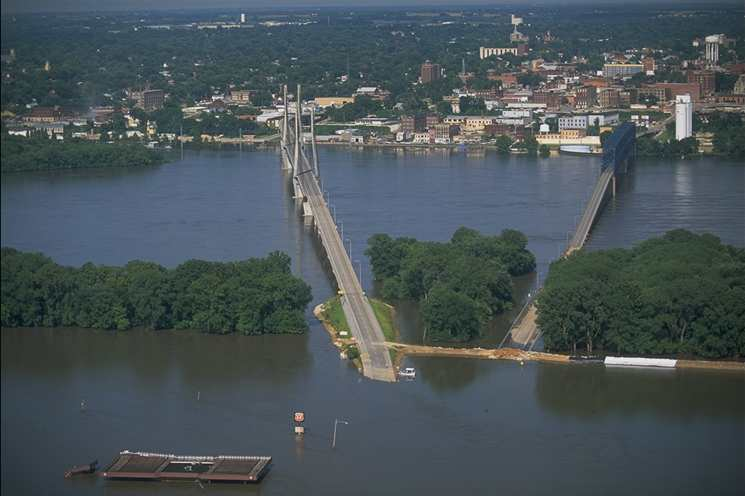
Quincy during the Great Flood of 1993. Quincy was protected by the bluffs; however, West Quincy, Missouri, across the river, was completely submerged.

Throughout the 19th century, Quincy had grown from a backwater hamlet along the Mississippi River to become one of the state's most important cities and ports. Activity from rail and steamboat continued to flourish and Quincy benefited from the increased traffic. It was during the early decades of the 20th century that many of the city's historic buildings in the Downtown Quincy Historic District were constructed, including the city's first skyscraper, the Western Catholic Union Building, in 1925.

The increasing presence of the automobile led Quincy to consider alternatives to Mississippi River crossings. Prior to the automobile, the most common means of crossing the near-mile wide river was by boat or ferry. In 1928, construction began on the Memorial Bridge which was a two-lane truss toll bridge; it opened in May 1930. By 1945, the city had repaid its outstanding bonds and eliminated the toll.

On April 12, 1945, a tornado ripped through the business district of Quincy and severely damaged the courthouse. The wind was so severe that it blew the roof off the structure, damaging it beyond repair. Because the incident occurred a few hours after news reached Quincy of President Roosevelt's death, several residents joked that "FDR and God were just fighting over the power-up there." Five years passed before a new courthouse was completed.

On September 27, 1976, three improvised explosive devices were detonated at the Colt Industries Inc. Quincy Compressor Division Plant. A team of EOD Specialists from Fort Leonard Wood, in the area in support of the Secret Service during a visit to Quincy by Republican vice-presidential candidate Bob Dole, was called to respond. A fourth unexploded IED was discovered by Quincy firefighters during a search of the plant. During an examination of the device, it detonated, killing the EOD team supervisor, Sergeant Major Kenneth Foster Sr. and seriously injuring the Illinois State Arson Inspector.

In 1987, the cable-stayed Bayview Bridge was constructed with the intent of alleviating traffic on the aging Memorial Bridge. Today the two bridges complement each other by Bayview carrying westbound traffic and Memorial carrying eastbound. Although lighting was originally intended for the Bayview Bridge during its construction phase, the actual installation of lights did not occur until 2015.

During the Mississippi River flood of 1993, riverside businesses and industries suffered extensive damage when the river crested at a record 32.2 feet (9.81 m), 15 feet (4.6 m) above flood stage. For a time, the Bayview Bridge, one of Quincy's two bridges, was the only bridge open across the Mississippi River between Alton, Illinois and Burlington, Iowa. The Memorial Bridge was closed from the end of June, due to water over its western approach. On July 16, 1993, the Bayview Bridge closed when the river submerged the land on the west side of the Mississippi River at Taylor, Missouri; Quincy's bridges reopened 73 days later on September 26, 1993.

On November 19, 1996, the United Express Flight 5925 collided on landing at Quincy with another Beechcraft, a private King Air, that was taking off from an intersecting runway. All occupants of both planes, twelve on board the 5925 and two on board the King Air, were killed as a result.

A flood in June 2008 submerged much of Quincy's riverfront and low-lying regions not protected by the bluffs. Record Mississippi River levels occurred on June 22, 2008. The Red Cross accepted donations for Quincy and other communities in Adams County, as natural disaster funds were depleted in 2010.

Quincy has been twice recognized as an All-America City and is a participant in the Tree City USA program. In the fall of 2010, Forbes listed Quincy as the eighth "Best Small City To Raise A Family."

In January 2024, Quincy Police Chief Adam Yates announced a full strength staff of 73 sworn police officers.

In April 2025, independent challenger Linda Moore won election to become Quincy's mayor, defeating incumbent Mike Troup.

== Geography ==
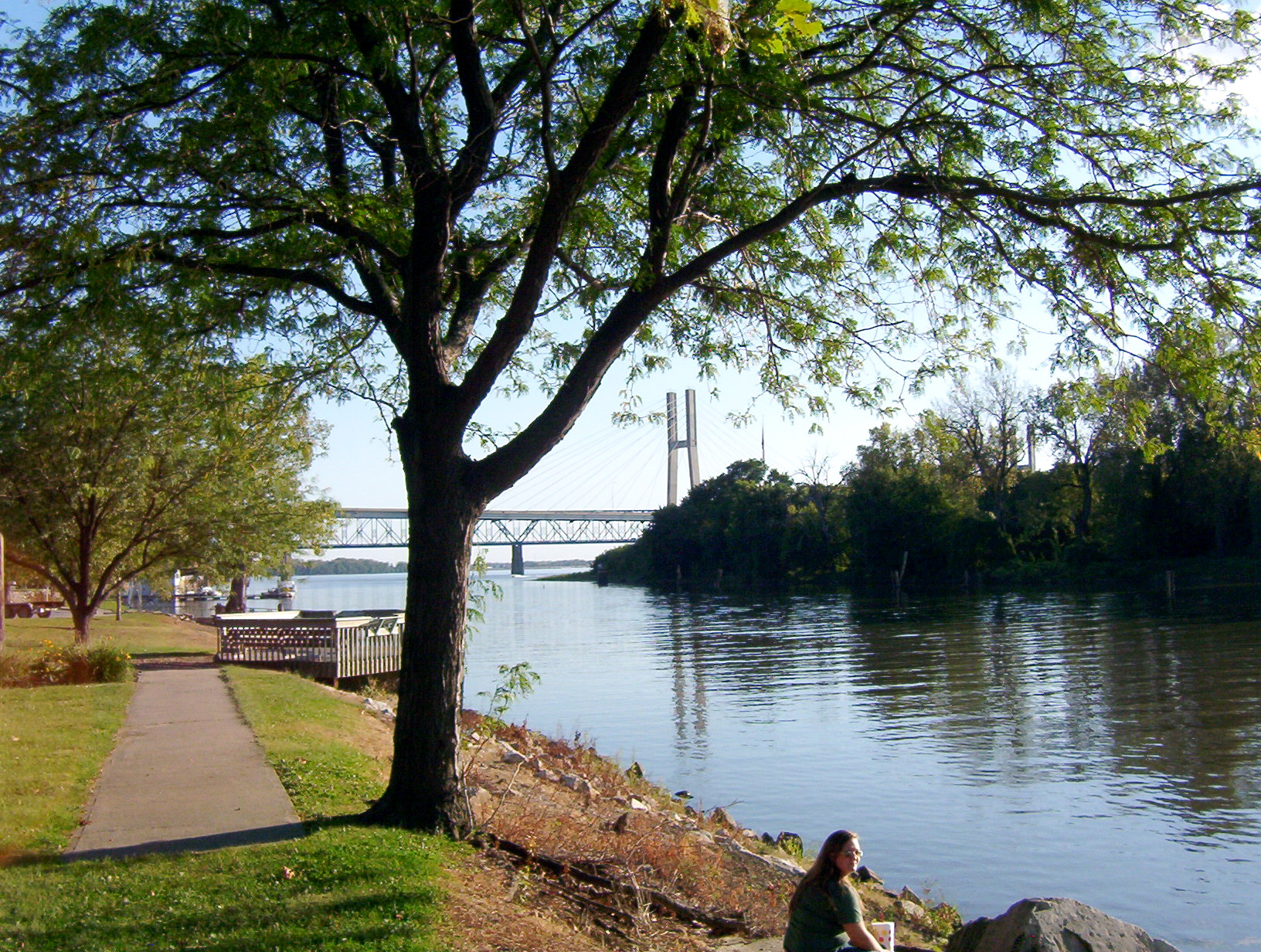
The Mississippi Riverfront in Quincy

Quincy is located at 39°55′56″N 91°23′19″W (39.932335, -91.388737). It is adjacent to the Mississippi River and Quincy Bay, a large inlet of water fed by Cedar and Homan Creeks. According to the 2021 census gazetteer files, Quincy has a total area of 15.81 square miles (40.95 km^{2}), of which 15.77 square miles (40.84 km^{2}) (or 99.73%) is land and 0.04 square miles (0.10 km^{2}) (or 0.27%) is water.

The city is situated on bluffs overlooking the Mississippi River. Adjacent to Quincy, on the Missouri side of the river, is West Quincy, Missouri and a vast floodplain used primarily for farming. East of Quincy lies the Quincy Hills geographic region, a region of hills that are similar to the Lincoln Hills in Missouri, where a mixture of rolling hills, woods, and farming shape the landscape. Flat prairie lie north of Quincy and as the Mississippi turns sharply to the southwest; bluffs, floodplain, and farmland lie to the south and southwest of the city.

The Quincy micropolitan area includes Adams County, Illinois and Lewis County, Missouri and together hold a population of 75,546. Due to its proximity to Hannibal, Missouri, the two communities have been bulked into Quincy-Hannibal, IL-MO Combined Statistical Area which holds approximately 116,000 residents. As of the 2010 Census, it is currently ranked as the 156th most populated CSA in the United States.

Geographically, Quincy is the largest city and central hub of the tri-state area encompassing western Illinois, northeastern Missouri, and southeastern Iowa.

Quincy has several suburbs. North Quincy is the city's most populated suburb and lies to the north, beyond a rail line and a large creek. Hickory Grove, Illinois is an edge town and lies adjacent to Quincy to its east, bordered by Interstate 172. The town of Marblehead lies to the south, and West Quincy to the west.

The Hannibal–Quincy micropolitan area is also technically not located within the nearby St. Louis metropolitan, but are regionally associated due to their proximity and accessibility to Greater St. Louis.

=== Climate ===
Climate data for Quincy Regional Airport, Illinois (1991–2020 normals, extremes 1901–present)
Month	Jan	Feb	Mar	Apr	May	Jun	Jul	Aug	Sep	Oct	Nov	Dec	Year
Record high °F (°C)	73 (23)	80 (27)	89 (32)	92 (33)	103 (39)	105 (41)	114 (46)	111 (44)	105 (41)	96 (36)	84 (29)	75 (24)	114 (46)
Mean maximum °F (°C)	57.8 (14.3)	63.5 (17.5)	74.8 (23.8)	82.2 (27.9)	87.4 (30.8)	92.7 (33.7)	95.6 (35.3)	95.3 (35.2)	91.1 (32.8)	84.2 (29.0)	71.4 (21.9)	62.4 (16.9)	97.6 (36.4)
Mean daily maximum °F (°C)	34.6 (1.4)	39.7 (4.3)	51.7 (10.9)	63.7 (17.6)	73.3 (22.9)	82.4 (28.0)	86.0 (30.0)	84.5 (29.2)	77.9 (25.5)	65.3 (18.5)	51.2 (10.7)	39.3 (4.1)	62.5 (16.9)
Daily mean °F (°C)	26.6 (−3.0)	31.2 (−0.4)	42.1 (5.6)	53.3 (11.8)	63.6 (17.6)	72.8 (22.7)	76.3 (24.6)	74.5 (23.6)	67.0 (19.4)	55.1 (12.8)	42.3 (5.7)	31.6 (−0.2)	53.0 (11.7)
Mean daily minimum °F (°C)	18.6 (−7.4)	22.7 (−5.2)	32.4 (0.2)	42.8 (6.0)	53.9 (12.2)	63.1 (17.3)	66.5 (19.2)	64.5 (18.1)	56.1 (13.4)	44.8 (7.1)	33.4 (0.8)	23.9 (−4.5)	43.6 (6.4)
Mean minimum °F (°C)	−3.4 (−19.7)	2.4 (−16.4)	12.6 (−10.8)	26.9 (−2.8)	38.6 (3.7)	50.9 (10.5)	56.4 (13.6)	54.3 (12.4)	40.7 (4.8)	28.2 (−2.1)	16.3 (−8.7)	3.8 (−15.7)	−7.4 (−21.9)
Record low °F (°C)	−21 (−29)	−29 (−34)	−13 (−25)	9 (−13)	26 (−3)	39 (4)	47 (8)	42 (6)	26 (−3)	10 (−12)	−11 (−24)	−22 (−30)	−29 (−34)
Average precipitation inches (mm)	1.57 (40)	1.77 (45)	2.29 (58)	3.98 (101)	4.55 (116)	4.50 (114)	3.49 (89)	3.93 (100)	3.09 (78)	3.05 (77)	2.41 (61)	1.80 (46)	36.43 (925)
Average precipitation days (≥ 0.01 in)	7.8	7.4	10.1	11.6	12.8	10.3	9.1	8.4	7.5	8.9	8.0	7.2	109.1
Source 1: NOAA
Source 2: xmACIS2

== Demographics ==
Historical population
Census	Pop.	Note	%±
1840	2,319		—
1850	6,902		197.6%
1860	13,718		98.8%
1870	24,052		75.3%
1880	27,268		13.4%
1890	31,494		15.5%
1900	36,252		15.1%
1910	36,587		0.9%
1920	35,978		−1.7%
1930	39,241		9.1%
1940	40,469		3.1%
1950	41,450		2.4%
1960	43,793		5.7%
1970	45,288		3.4%
1980	42,554		−6.0%
1990	39,681		−6.8%
2000	40,366		1.7%
2010	40,633		0.7%
2020	39,463		−2.9%
U.S. Decennial Census

=== 2020 census ===
As of the 2020 census, Quincy had a population of 39,463 living in 17,052 households and 9,940 families. The population density was 2,496.55 inhabitants per square mile (963.92/km^{2}). There were 19,028 housing units at an average density of 1,203.77 per square mile (464.78/km^{2}).

The median age was 40.2 years. 21.8% of residents were under the age of 18 and 20.9% of residents were 65 years of age or older. For every 100 females there were 93.2 males, and for every 100 females age 18 and over there were 90.2 males age 18 and over.

100.0% of residents lived in urban areas, while 0.0% lived in rural areas.

There were 17,052 households in Quincy, of which 25.7% had children under the age of 18 living in them. Of all households, 38.8% were married-couple households, 20.1% were households with a male householder and no spouse or partner present, and 32.7% were households with a female householder and no spouse or partner present. About 36.7% of all households were made up of individuals and 16.2% had someone living alone who was 65 years of age or older.

There were 19,028 housing units, of which 10.4% were vacant. The homeowner vacancy rate was 2.0% and the rental vacancy rate was 11.6%.

Racial composition as of the 2020 census
Race	Number	Percent
White	34,064	86.3%
Black or African American	2,315	5.9%
American Indian and Alaska Native	71	0.2%
Asian	400	1.0%
Native Hawaiian and Other Pacific Islander	33	0.1%
Some other race	373	0.9%
Two or more races	2,207	5.6%
Hispanic or Latino (of any race)	919	2.3%

=== Income ===
The median income for a household in the city was $46,935, and the median income for a family was $64,891. Males had a median income of $40,636 versus $26,977 for females. The per capita income for the city was $29,105. About 11.4% of families and 15.3% of the population were below the poverty line, including 22.7% of those under age 18 and 12.7% of those age 65 or over.

== Economy ==
Companies based in Quincy include Niemann Foods, Gardner Denver, Kohl Wholesale and the Knapheide Manufacturing Company. GatesAir Television and Radio Transmission has a facility in town, as does Broadcast Electronics. Titan Wheel (Titan International) is also located in Quincy. Blessing Hospital, the Quincy Public Schools and Titan are the top three employers in the area.

In 1978 the Great River Economic Development Foundation was formed. This private, non-profit organization was designed to retain existing businesses and attract new ones to the area. This organization has been instrumental in putting the Quincy-Hannibal Area on the map as a distinct region in conjunction with the major metropolitan areas nearby such as Chicago, IL, St. Louis, MO, and even Kansas City, MO. As a whole, Quincy falls from average to just above average in several economic categories in comparison to the national averages.

The cost of living in Quincy is well below the national average. The city is also below the national averages in cost of food, utilities and other miscellaneous costs. In the fall of 2010 Quincy was listed as eighth in the top fifteen small cities to raise a family in the United States by Forbes magazine for its commute times, high school graduation rate, median household income, home ownership rate and cost of living. Forbes compared 126 cities with a population under 100,000 and ranked them on these five quality-of-life measures.

== Arts and culture ==
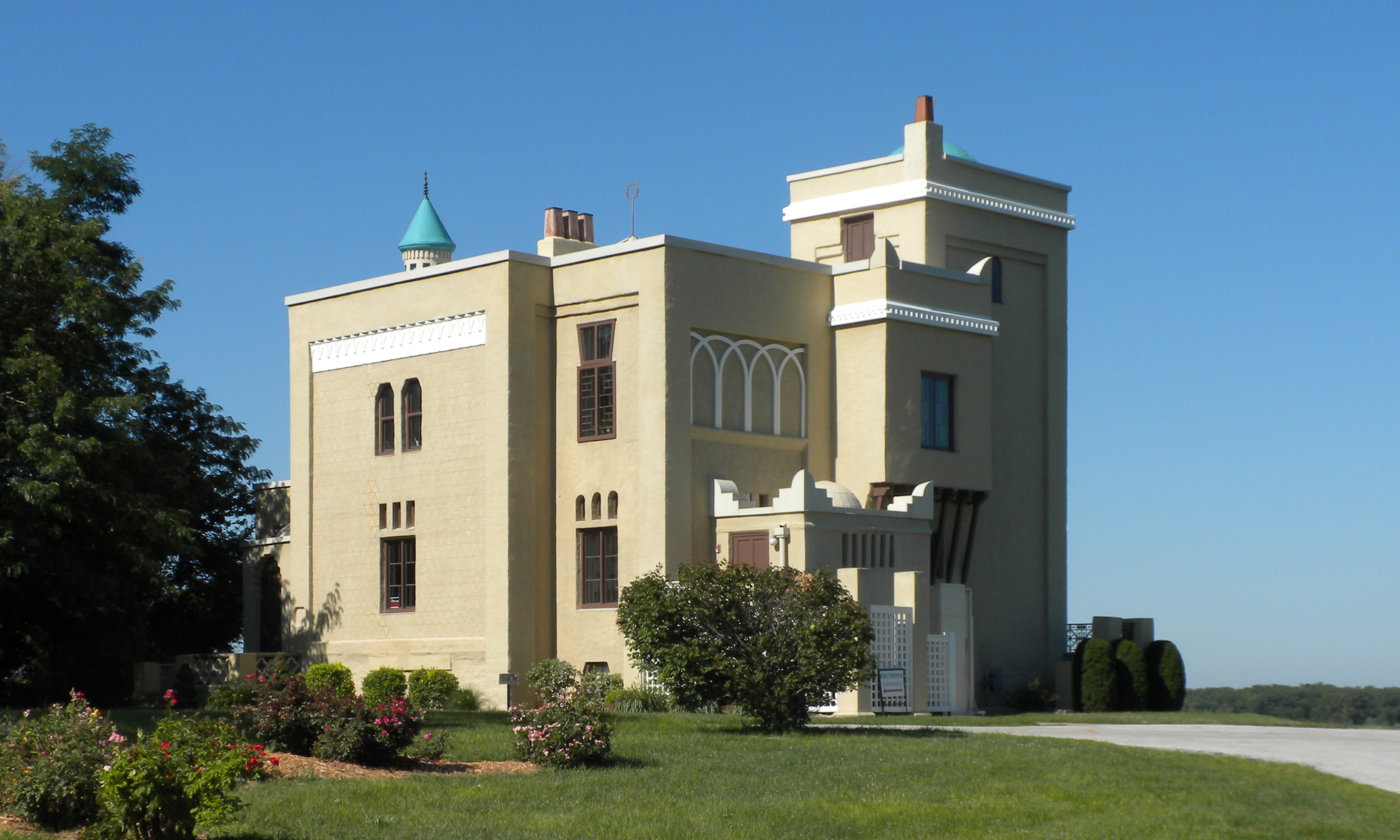
Villa Kathrine

Quincy and the surrounding region lie in a blended zone of midwestern culture, where influences from the Heartland and Rust Belt converge. It is the site of America's first arts council, Quincy Society of Fine Arts, which was founded in 1947 by George M. Irwin. Irwin also founded Quincy Little Symphony (now known as the Quincy Symphony Orchestra Association) in 1947. Quincy was also named to Expedia's list of America's Most Artistic Towns in 2017 and 2018.

The Dogwood Festival is an annual event held in early May celebrating the blossoming dogwoods located throughout the city. A parade marches down Maine Street, but Washington Park no longer hosts amusement rides as of 2021. Washington Park and downtown also become the focal point of activity for farmer's markets, Q-Fest, formerly the Midsummer Arts Faire, the Tin Dusters, and the Gus Macker 3-on-3 basketball tournament.

The Historical Society of Quincy and Adams County operate at the history museum, the John Wood Mansion and Woodland Cemetery. In 2018, Quincy Community Theatre opened its 81st season. Quincy Art Center and Quincy Museum host the annual Art Fest & Folk Life Festival on Maine Street each September.

Quincy's riverfront is also a center for popular activities throughout the year, including the Fourth of July display on the Quincy Bay, outdoor showings of movies, and concerts. The Quincy Area Convention and Visitors Bureau is an example of Mediterranean Revival architecture, the Villa Kathrine.

=== Architecture ===
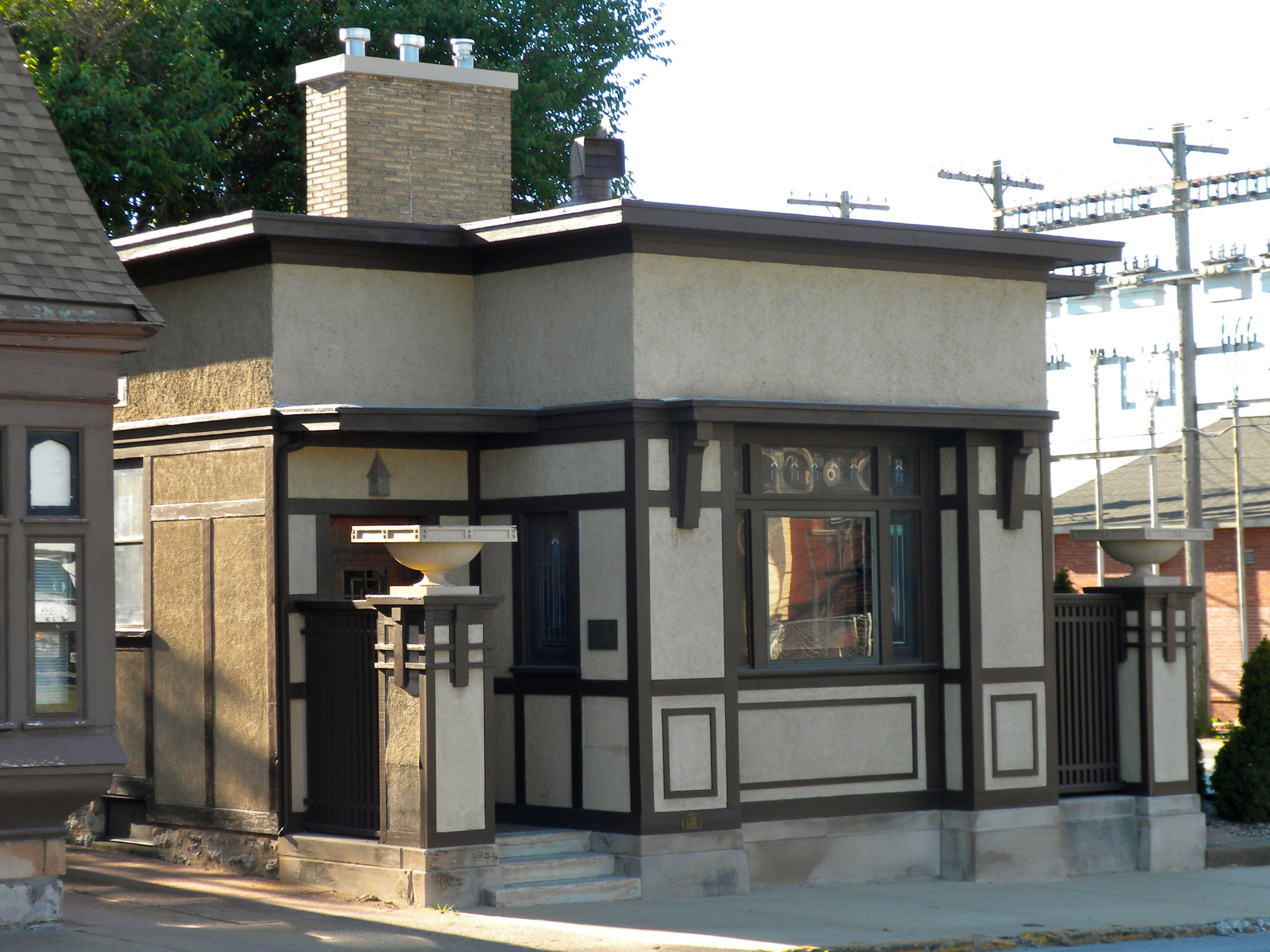
The Ernest M. Wood Office and Studio, an example of Prairie style architecture.

South of downtown is the South Side German Historic District, which holds many of the German-influenced structures that early immigrants built. A central site in the district is the Dick Brothers Brewery buildings, which were constructed in 1857 and rivaled many larger breweries. The lager tunnel system and natural aquifer can still be found underground. Although the brewery survived Prohibition by bottling water and other beverages, slow modernization efforts forced the brewery into bankruptcy. However, the buildings remain and are being renovated for public use and commercial space. Other examples of rich German-influence in Quincy can also be seen in the many brick homes within the district.

Francis Hall of Quincy University is another example of German influence in the city's structures.

Other than the South Side, Maine Street and the East End are popular strips where Quincy's rich architectural history is displayed. Once housing some of Quincy's elite, many of the homes in these regions are influenced mainly by Victorian schools. Known residents of this part of town included Richard Newcomb and city founder John Wood. Today, the Newcomb residence functions as the Quincy Museum and was once featured on the cover of National Geographic as "one of the most architecturally significant corners in the United States." There are many organizations in the town that continue to oversee renovations to structures, such as the Historical Society of Quincy and Adams County, and some residents allow for tours of their 19th-century homes.

There is also a significant Mediterranean influence to Quincy with the Villa Kathrine and B'nai Sholom Temple. In 1900, Quincy resident W. George Metz commissioned George Behrensmeyer to design a Moroccan-style home overlooking the river. It included a harem, courtyard, and reflecting pool. The Villa Kathrine functions as the visitor center. The Temple B'nai Sholom is another structure that was heavily influenced by the Moorish revival in the United States.

== Parks and recreation ==
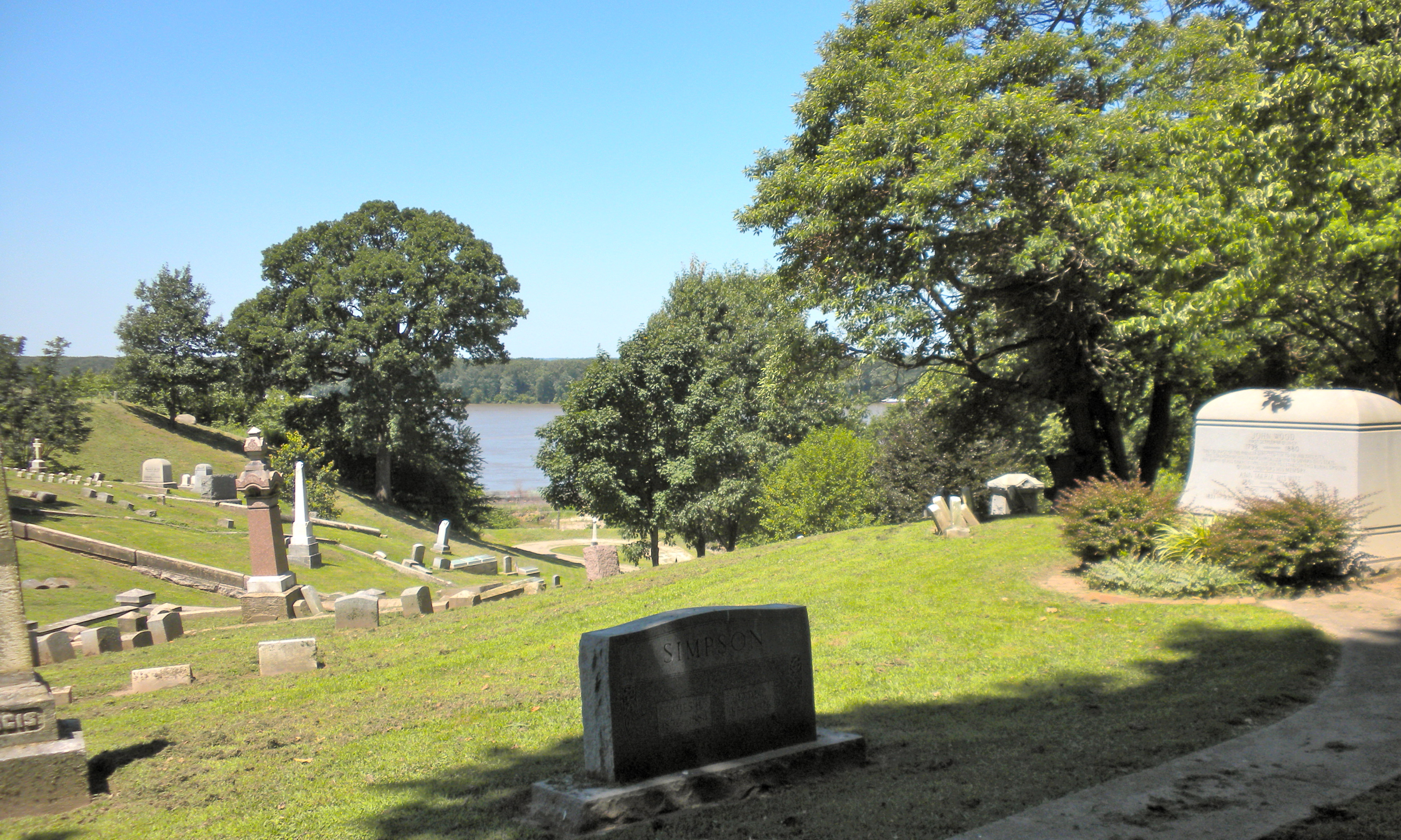
Woodland Cemetery

The Quincy Park District was founded in 1940 when five commissioners were elected to govern the district. Today the board for the Park District is made up of seven volunteers who serve four-year terms. Quincy Park District is made up of 26 separate parks totalling approximately 1,000 acres (400 ha).

Washington Park was the first park in Quincy. It is located downtown and sits on 4 acres (1.6 ha). Washington Park served as one of the locations in Illinois for the Lincoln-Douglas debates. Quinsippi Island is accessible through the All-American Park and comprises 130 acres (53 ha). Bob Mays Park sits on fifty acres of land and opened in 2008. The site of the first public pool was at Indian Mounds Park. It also sits on 37 acres (15 ha) of land. Moorman Park where visitors can find baseball and softball diamonds. Moorman Park sits on 80 acres (32 ha) and includes a batting cage and mini-golf course. Besides a swimming pool and baseball/softball diamonds, there are also tennis courts for the community to use. One park that has tennis courts is Reservoir Park where many city tennis tournaments are held.

== Education ==
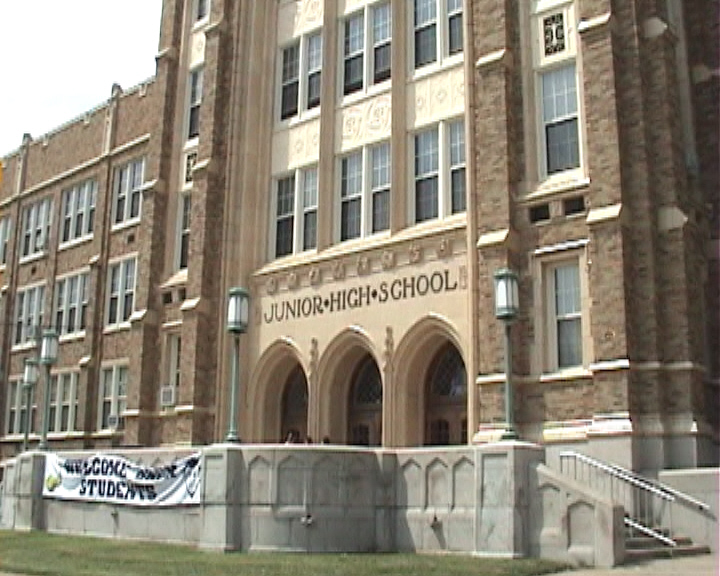
Quincy Junior High School

Quincy has a number of educational institutions within the city or close by.

The school district for Quincy is Quincy Public School District 172. Quincy Senior High School is located on Maine Street in Quincy. Quincy Notre Dame High School, a private Catholic high school, is also located in Quincy. Quincy University is located in Quincy and established in the 1860s. On the city's east side, John Wood Community College is the regional community college. Gem City College is located in the heart of downtown Quincy and the Blessing-Rieman College of Nursing and Health Sciences is located next door to Blessing Hospital. Regionally, Quincy is within driving distance of Western Illinois University in Macomb, Hannibal-LaGrange College downriver in Hannibal, Missouri, and Culver-Stockton College in Canton, Missouri.

== Media ==
Quincy's television market includes the cities of Quincy, Hannibal, Macomb, and Keokuk. The market was widely served by Insight Communications through 2007. In January 2008, Comcast took control of the cable television system. Satellite television services are provided by DirecTV or Dish.

The city is usually combined with Hannibal due to its proximity and labeled as the 170th market on the DMA chart. With regards to television service, Quincy and the surrounding region are served by affiliates of ABC, CBS, NBC, Fox, and the CW networks. STARadio Corporation and Quincy Media own many of the local media outlets in the region. As of February 2006, Quincy can receive 17 FM stations, 5 AM stations, and one NOAA Wideband Weather Radio station.

== Transportation ==
=== Highways ===
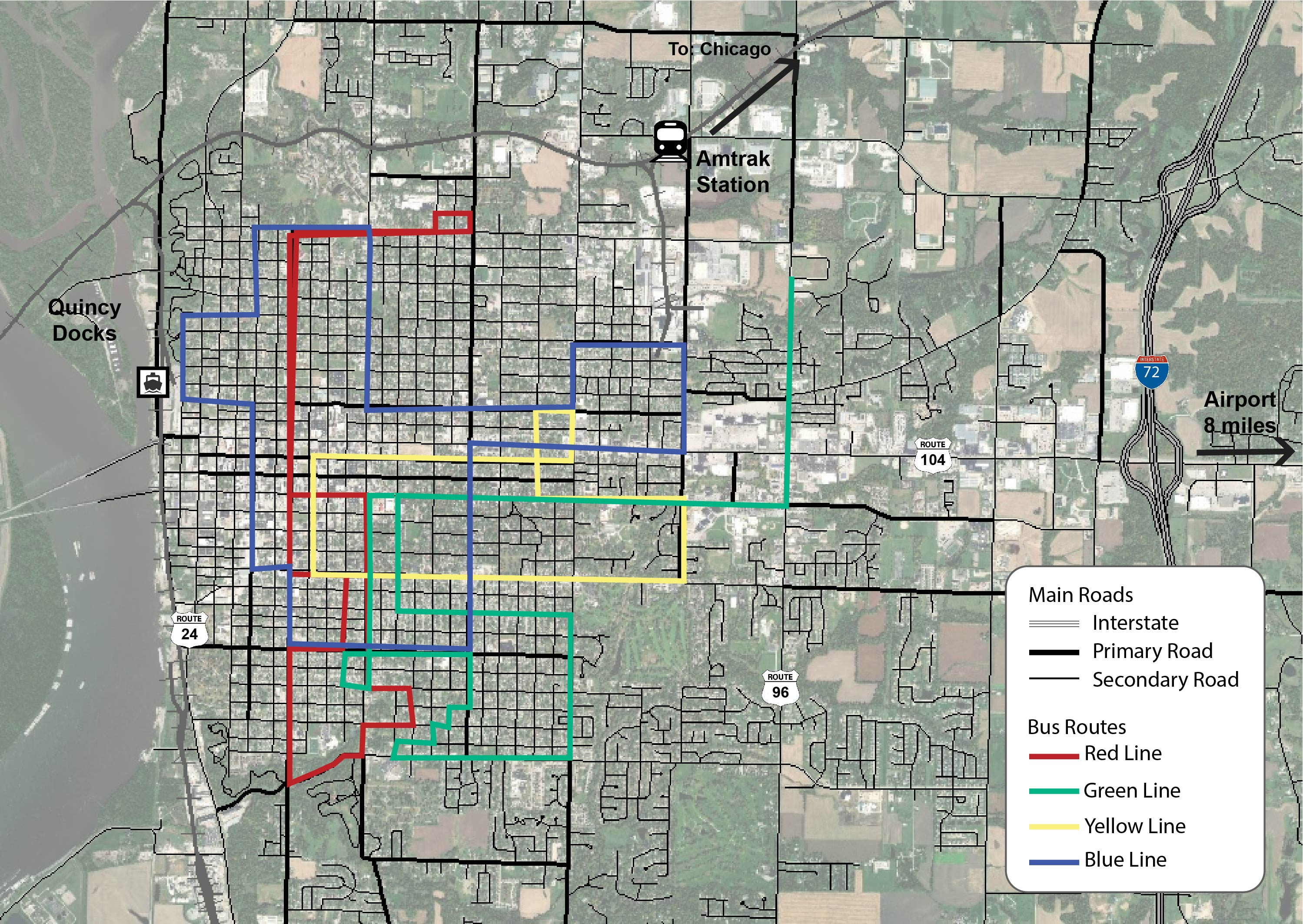
Quincy transportation map

Interstate 72 passes approximately 12 miles (19 km) south of Quincy. Its spur route, Interstate 172, passes just east of town. In recent years, the Prairie Trails Shopping Complex has been a focal point for development in this area. Illinois Route 104 (Broadway) is a main east–west artery from the Mississippi River bridges to Interstate 172. Illinois Route 96 enters the city from the southeast and travels north (through the east side of Quincy) to U.S. Route 24. Illinois Route 57 branches south from U.S. 24 downtown and passes Quincy's Civic Center on its way to Interstate 172 southeast of the city. Illinois 96 also serves as the Great River Road, which follows the path of the Mississippi River. Eastbound U.S. 24 crosses the Mississippi River from Missouri on the Quincy Memorial Bridge, while westbound traffic uses the newer Bayview Bridge. Bayview bridge was constructed in 1986, but was not built as a four-lane bridge because of budget cuts, as the cable suspension made it unaffordable to build a four-lane bridge. Other groups claimed that business in the downtown part of Quincy would decline if the Memorial bridge was shut down.

On the Missouri side, U.S. 61 carries the Avenue of the Saints, a four-lane highway connecting Saint Louis to Minneapolis–Saint Paul. The Avenue of the Saints derives its name from Saint Louis and Saint Paul, Minnesota.

Quincy is at the center of four-lane highways in all directions:

- The Avenue of the Saints passes just five miles to the west and is four-lane from Canada to the Gulf of Mexico.
- Illinois Highway 172 is part of the newly designated Route 110/CKC (Chicago–Kansas City Expressway) which offers a less-congested alternative route to these popular Midwest destinations.

=== Air ===
The Quincy Regional Airport is to Quincy's east, about 5 miles (8.0 km) outside of the city limits. Cape Air operates daily flights to Chicago-O'Hare, which is 222 flying miles from Quincy and St. Louis-Lambert, which is 93 miles away. It is the 425th busiest airport in America based on passenger counts. Flight instruction, plane rentals and hangar space are also available at the airport. Longest Runway: 7,098 ft. Width: 150 ft.

=== Rail ===
Quincy is an Amtrak community with a railroad station on the north side of town. Two state-supported trains, the Illinois Zephyr and the Carl Sandburg link Quincy with Chicago, Amtrak's main hub, with connections to hundreds of cities across the country. The Illinois Zephyr departs in the morning and arrives in the evening, while the Carl Sandburg arrives mid-day and departs in the late afternoon. Both make the same stops to Chicago's Union Station.

Burlington Northern Santa Fe and Norfolk Southern offer multiple freight trains daily and Burlington Junction Rail Road offers short line service many sites and development districts.

=== River ===
Quincy is home to the northernmost port on the Mississippi River for 12-month barge traffic. The municipal barge dock currently serves multiple industries in the South Quincy Development District. The Mid America Intermodal Port Commission is working to secure funding for an additional multimillion-dollar intermodal port facility.

=== Public transit ===
Quincy Transit Lines provides fixed-route and paratransit bus service throughout Quincy. There are four fixed routes, and each route is split into two branches. Those routes run Monday–Saturday, between 6:00 am and 6:00 pm. During Sundays and holidays, Quincy Transit Lines operates a pared-down version of the fixed-route system that is made up of two routes – the North route and the South route.

Quincy Transit Lines route Route 4 stops near the city's Amtrak station at Wissman Lane/30th Street intersection.

== Health and medicine ==
Quincy is home to Blessing Hospital and Quincy Medical Group. Specialty areas include a cancer center, cardiovascular center, outpatient surgery center, Level 2 trauma center, and rehabilitation. Blessing also operates the Blessing Rieman College of Nursing.

In August 2015, an outbreak of Legionnaires' disease resulted in 13 deaths and 74 infections at the Illinois Veterans' Home in Quincy.

== Notable people ==
- Mary Astor, Academy Award-winning actress
- Avenue Beat, pop/R&B trio
- Cora Agnes Benneson, attorney, lecturer, and writer
- Zachary Bruenger, racing driver
- Steve Buckley, soccer player
- Helen Calkins, mathematician
- Bruce Douglas, professional basketball player
- Nina Gomer Du Bois, civil rights activist
- Bruce Edwards, professional baseball player
- William F. Gibbs, Illinois state legislator, farmer, and businessman
- Jake Griffin, racing driver
- John W. Henry, businessman
- Frances A. Karnes, academic, educator, and writer
- Caren Kemner, Olympic volleyball player
- Alys Lorraine. operatic soprano
- Elmo McClain, Illinois state representative and teacher
- Brian McGinnis, firefighter and Green Party candidate
- Isaac S. Moses, rabbi
- Fritz Ostermueller, Major League Baseball pitcher
- Arthur Pitney, inventor of postage meter and co-founder of Pitney Bowes
- Dev Reeves, former professional soccer defender
- Rick Reuschel, Major League Baseball player
- Paul Reuschel, Major League Baseball player
- Ike Samuels, Major League Baseball player
- James Scott, criminal Great Flood of 1993
- James B. Stewart, lawyer, journalist and author
- William Bushnell Stout, inventor
- Michael Swango, serial killer and former physician
- Paul Tibbets, pilot who flew the Enola Gay
- Augustus Tolton first recognized African-American Roman Catholic priest in the United States
- Jonathan Van Ness, hairstylist and member of the Fab Five on Netflix's Queer Eye
- Irma Voigt, Dean of Women at Ohio University
- Elmer H. Wavering, president of Motorola and inventor
- John Wood, 12th Governor of Illinois
- James Ziliak, economist, educator, and author
- Stephen Ziliak, economist, educator, and author

== Sister cities ==
Quincy, Illinois has two sister cities.

- Herford, Germany
- Jiaxing, Zhejiang, China

== See also ==
- Potawatomi Trail of Death
- United Express Flight 5925
- List of people from Quincy, Illinois
