= Adams County Courthouse (Illinois) =

Local government building in the United States

Coordinates: 39°56′6″N 91°24′28″W

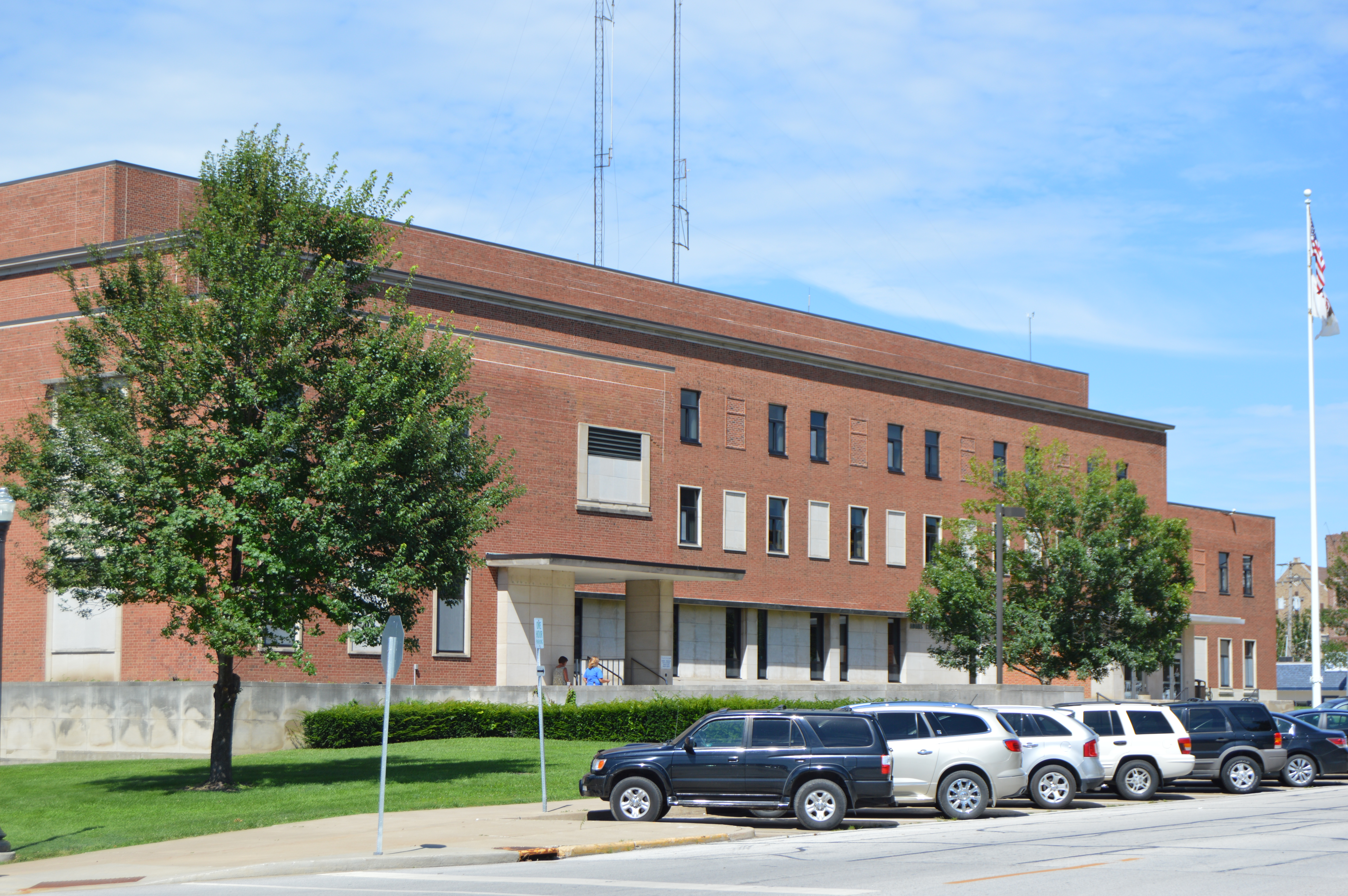
Front, seen from the west

The Adams County Courthouse is a government building in central Quincy, the county seat of Adams County, Illinois, United States. Built in 1950 after a tornado destroyed its predecessor, it is the fourth building to serve as a courthouse for Adams County.

== Previous courthouses ==
Adams County was created by the Legislature in early 1825,and by year's end, the county commissioners had produced specifications for the first courthouse; this structure was a square log building completed in early 1826. Few public buildings being available in Quincy at the time, it was also employed as a school, a church building, and a general meeting space. After ten years of use, it was destroyed by a fire in 1836, and a new brick courthouse was begun, but it too fell prey to fire in 1875. A peaceful county seat war ensued, but Quincy defeated the challenge from Coatsburg by a wide margin, and the county's third courthouse was completed and occupied in 1877.

== Current courthouse ==
Downtown Quincy was severely damaged by an April 1945 tornado, and the 1877 courthouse was one of many buildings destroyed in the storm. A five-year construction process culminated with the dedication of a fourth courthouse in 1950. Two separate architectural firms were involved: Hafner and Hafner oversaw the construction of a design produced by Holabird, Root, and Burgee. Like the second and third courthouses, the fourth is a brick building, although neither the Greek Revival second building similar to the Putnam County Courthouse, nor the Neoclassical third building, at all resembles the modernist fourth building. Three stories tall, the courthouse possesses an unadorned facade that faces a parking area.
