= Downtown Quincy Historic District =

Historic district in Illinois, United States

- U.S. National Register of Historic Places
- U.S. Historic district
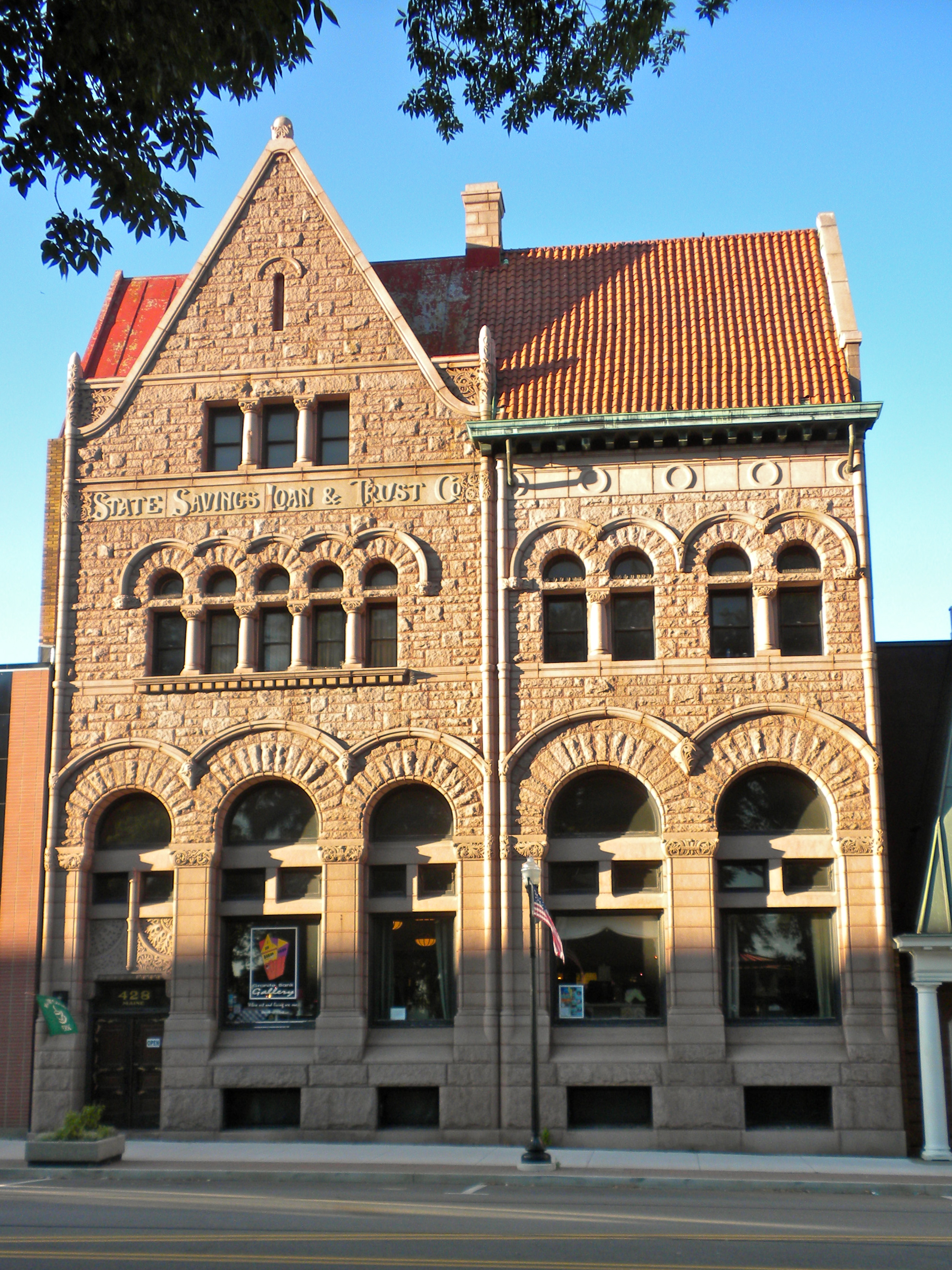
- State Savings Loan & Trust Building on Maine St.

- Location within Illinois
- Location: Quincy, Illinois
- Coordinates: 39°55′57.33″N 91°24′33.3″W
- Built: Late 19th century to early 20th century
- Architect: Multiple
- NRHP reference No.: 83000298
- Added to NRHP: April 7, 1983

The Downtown Quincy Historic District is a historic district located in downtown Quincy, Illinois, containing numerous buildings showcasing some of the city's late 19th century and early 20th century architecture. In the 1800s, Quincy was a popular destination for travelers making their way west via rail service. The Mississippi River was also a major economic benefit for the community, furthering the city's importance in commerce.

== Notable structures and attractions ==
=== Elkton Hotel ===
The Elkton Hotel was built in 1924 as a collaboration project by local architects Martin Geise and Harvey Chatten. It was to function as the new home for the Elks Club. Geometric shapes on the brick structure are some of the more striking features of this building. In 1949, the upper floors were converted into apartments and the structure was re-branded as the Elkton Hotel. As for the original Elks Club clubrooms, they have been converted into a popular restaurant known as the Patio.

=== History Museum ===
Completed in 1888, the History Museum first functioned as the Quincy Public Library. It is a Romanesque Revival-style structure facing Washington Park. Following its years as a public library, the building functioned as the Gardner Museum of Architecture and Design. In addition to providing a glimpse at Quincy's rich architectural history, one of the museum's most extensive collections included a permanent exhibit of stained glass. Due to budget cuts, the museum closed in 2012, and most of its exhibits and stained glass were purchased by the Historical Society of Quincy and Adams County. The building currently houses the History Museum. The museum displays selections of the extensive collections owned by the Society. The Historical Society also offers special events and speakers related to Quincy's rich history.

=== Hotel Quincy ===
The Hotel Quincy (originally known as the New Tremont Hotel) is a 7-story tall (100 ft) structure, completed in 1910, that functions as an apartment complex and also is the television studio for local NBC affiliate WGEM-TV.

=== Illinois State Bank ===
Beginning construction in 1880, the Illinois State Bank is a seven-story-tall structure showcasing Chicago-style architecture and was designed by Quincy architect Martin Geise. The first floor, housing the bank, featured a large White Colorado marble lobby with ivory and gold fixtures.

=== Kresge Building ===
External videos
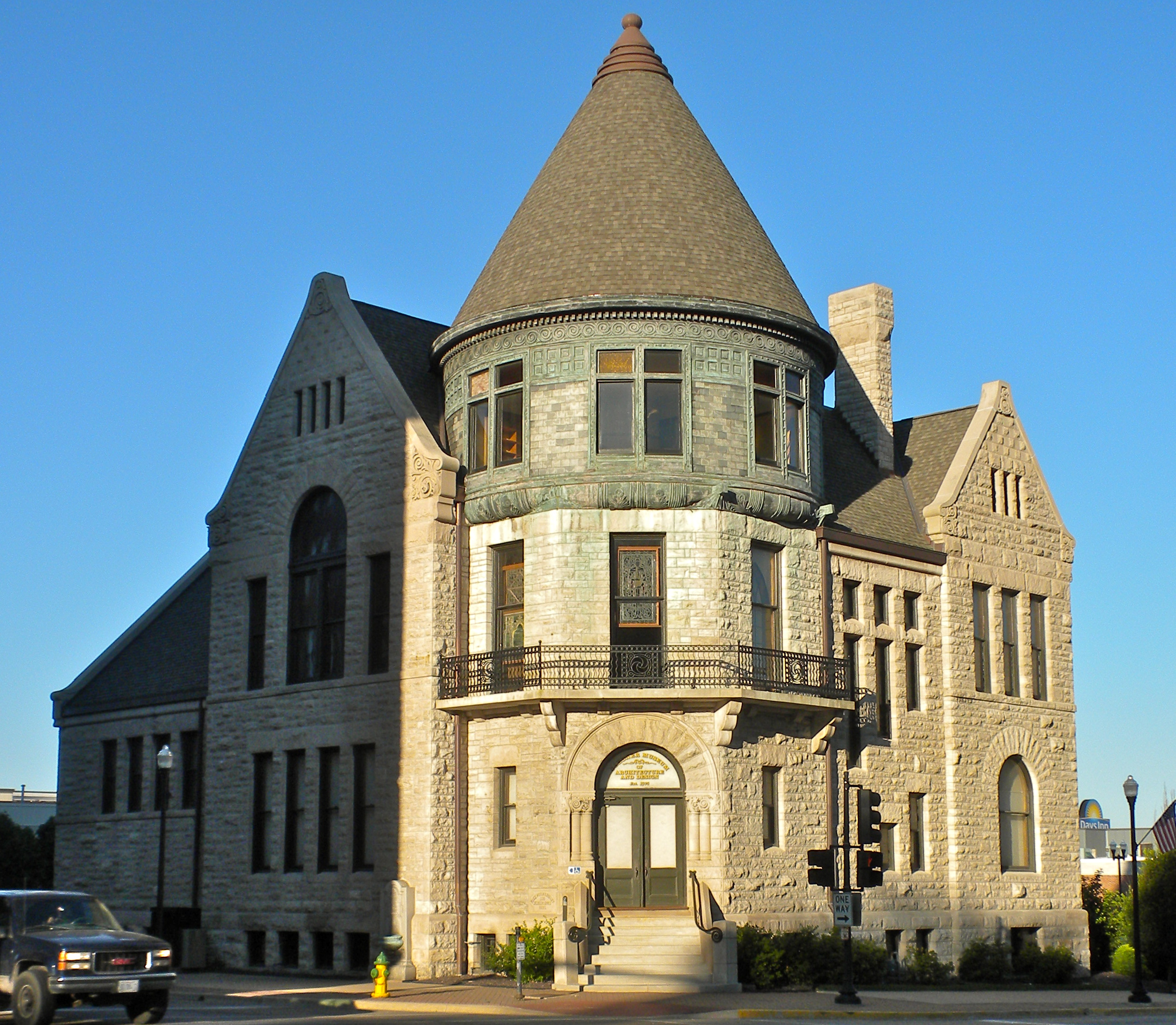
- Free & Public Library, The District/WGEM
- Kresge Building, The District/WGEM

The Kresge Building began its construction in 1923, and an additional phase of its construction began in 1939. It was designed by architect Harold Holmes. Controversy resulted when the developers wanted to construct only two levels, when the city required three by ordinance. Finding a way around the ordinance, the developers decided to create two levels of windows, thereby observing the city ordinance while maintaining the owners' request for two stories. In 1968, a massive fire damaged much of the building and the future of the structure was in jeopardy. Dale Kirlin Sr., who previously worked at the Kresge Building in his youth, decided to purchase the fire-damaged structure, extensively renovate, and re-locate the Kirlin's Hallmark company into the structure.

=== Lincoln-Douglas Apartment Building ===
The Lincoln-Douglas Apartment Building is a renovated, eight-story-tall apartment complex that caters to low-income seniors and was funded in part by the U.S. Department of Housing and Urban Development. It also functions as the main studio and headquarters of STARadio Corporation, a local broadcasting company that owns several radio stations throughout the region.

=== "Looking For Lincoln" historic markers ===
Throughout downtown Quincy and the historic district lie numerous information plaques trailing US President Abraham Lincoln's life in Illinois, mostly following his time as an attorney in this part of the state.

=== Masonic Temple ===
Built with a Renaissance Revival design intended, the Masonic Temple was constructed in 1911 at a cost of US$84,000 and includes a reception hall, parlor, library, and armory for the Knights Templar.

=== Quincy Post Office ===
The historic Quincy Post Office, built in 1887, also functioned as the Adams County Courthouse for a time. The Quincy Post Office is designed in the Châteauesque style. It was designed by renown architect Mifflin E. Bell, whom was known for his work on government structures. This Post Office was constructed with brick bearing walls and a limestone exterior and added to the National Register of Historic Places in 1977.

=== St. John's Anglican Parish ===
Established in 1837 as the first Anglican/Episcopal church in Quincy, the current building of St. John's Parish dates to 1853 and is the oldest existing church in Quincy. The church, now the cathedral of the Diocese of Quincy, was designed in an early Gothic revival style by Charles Howland and was built of native, uncoursed limestone measuring 75 feet by 40 feet. A rear and side chancel were added after the primary church building was constructed in the 1850s. The bell tower includes 11 bells and is the only true carillon in Quincy. The church interior includes a reredos designed by Ralph Adams Cram and two stained glass windows crafted by Louis Comfort Tiffany.

=== Schott Building ===
With Romanesque Revival and Sullivanesque influences in mind, the Schott Building was constructed in the 1890s by Swiss architect John Batschy. Today, a restaurant is housed on the first floor and the building was extensively used in the 2009 independent horror film Hampshire: A Ghost Story.

=== S.J. Lesem Building ===
The S.J. Lesem Building is a four-story, Italian-style brick building that first saw use as a warehouse and was completed in 1871. Today, it houses lofts in the upper floors and the first floor is home to the Tiramisu Italian restaurant.

=== State Savings Loan and Trust ===
The State Street Savings Loan & Trust Building is an example of Richardsonian Romanesque architecture and was constructed in 1892 by Chicago architects Patton & Fischer. In 1906, an extension was made, designed by local architect Ernest M. Wood. The bank suffered following the Depression and was nearly demolished before being bought by George M. Irwin in 1964. Irwin renovated the structure and converted the lobby to function for retail space. It was added to the National Register of Historic Places in 1979. In January 2000, the structure served as the backdrop to President Bill Clinton's visit to Quincy.

=== Villa Katherine ===
The Villa Kathrine is a Moroccan-style home built in 1900 that overlooks the Mississippi River from atop the bluffs. It was built for wealthy Quincy resident W. George Metz, who grew fond of Moroccan architecture during his travels abroad. Rumor had it that Metz's intention was to live in the home with a woman he met on his travels, but she refused to move to Illinois or died en route. The structure was sold in 1912, fell into disrepair, and then restored by the local group Friends of the Castle. Today, the Villa Kathrine functions as Quincy's Visitor Center and gives tours of the home.

=== Washington Park ===
Washington Park is Quincy's first park and was once known as John's Square, after city founder John Wood. It was the site of the sixth famous debate between Abraham Lincoln and Stephen A. Douglas over the divisive issue of slavery and national union, where a crowd of 10–15,000 people came to hear the two men speak. In 1994, a nationally televised re-enactment of the Lincoln-Douglas debates was broadcast on C-SPAN. It is also the site chosen for many of Quincy's festivities including the Dogwood Festival, Blues in the District, and the Midsummer Art Festival.

=== Washington Theater ===
Washington Theater is a 1480-seat theater built in 1924 to cater to stage and cinema showings. The structure is notable for its influences in Mediterranean and Byzantine architecture. It was remodeled in 1926 following the purchase of the theater to Balaban & Katz. In the years that followed, the theater hosted many vaudeville and photoplay shows, but suffered when films introduced sound. This prompted yet another upgrade to bring audiences back once sound pictures became the industry's standard. The Kerasotes Theater chain bought the site in 1971 and continued to show films into the 1980s. Since, Washington Theater has undergone several purchases and became neglected by owners before coming into possession by the City of Quincy. Currently, an organization is renovating the space to modernize the theater and to eventually re-open.

=== Western Catholic Union Building ===
The Western Catholic Union Building is an 11-story tall skyscraper in downtown Quincy built in the beaux-arts style. It was constructed in 1925 by a Catholic fraternal-insurance group and took two years to complete construction. Some features of the structure included a rooftop garden, auditorium, a barber shoppe, four bowling alleys, office spaces, a small gym, and a swimming pool in the basement. In 1929, the swimming pool was closed and covered to allow additional office space after a crack in the wall was found. Today, the WCU Building remains as Quincy's tallest structure.

== Non-Historic Structures ==
=== Oakley-Lindsay Center ===
The Oakley-Lindsay Center is the regional convention center for Quincy, Illinois and the tri-state region. It opened in 1995 at a cost of $8 million. It serves as the convention hub of the Quincy micropolitan area and fills the market in-between St. Louis and Iowa City. It hosts concerts, wedding receptions, rodeos, and other numerous events.

=== Quincy Newspapers Corporate Headquarters ===
The headquarters of Quincy Newspapers is located in the southern portion of downtown and this structure acts as the printing press for the regional newspaper, the Quincy Herald-Whig, and also houses QNI's corporate offices. The company owns several local television stations around the Midwest, and their flagship network, WGEM, is headquartered down the street in the Hotel Quincy.

=== Salvation Army's Ray & Joan KROC Center ===
Opened in 2011, the Salvation Army's Ray & Joan KROC Center functions as a state-of-the-art, private membership community center with amenities including an indoor swimming pool with slide, a 499-seat auditorium, gymnasiums, a game room, and a cafe. It was awarded a silver LEED certificate for being an environmentally-friendly structure.

== Former structures and attractions ==
=== Newcomb Hotel ===
The Newcomb Hotel, located adjacent to both the Gardner Museum and Washington Park, was a former 130-room, five-story hotel built in 1888. It was designed by St. Louis architect Issac S. Taylor and funded by Quincy-Chicago businessman Richard Newcomb, who owned the Gem City Paper Mill. The hotel opened on the same day as the inauguration of President Benjamin Harrison, and a ball was held in his honor. For a time, it was considered the finest hotel in the state outside of Chicago. A major fire struck the structure in 1904 and killed two workers. In the years since, the hotel fell into disrepair and continued to deteriorate due to neglect. In 2013, the structure was listed as one of Illinois' most-endangered historic places.

On September 6, 2013, the hotel caught fire, causing significant damage to the structure. It was considered a total loss and demolished the following Sunday.

=== Old Adams County Courthouse ===
On April 12, 1945, a tornado ripped through the business district of Quincy, Illinois, and severely damaged the courthouse. The wind was so severe that it blew the roof off of the structure, damaging it beyond repair. Because the incident occurred a few hours after news reached Quincy of President Roosevelt's death, several residents joked that "FDR and God were just fighting over the power up there."

== Annual events and attractions ==
The Downtown Quincy Historic District hosts several major events throughout the year. During summer months, Washington Park holds Blues in the District, a free concert featuring many blues musicians. Washington Park is also the site for the local Farmers' market and the Midsummer Arts Faire, an event that showcases artist work's from around the region. Amusement rides encircle the town square also during the Dogwood Parade and Festival in May, while basketball players from around the region converge into the district to play in the 3-on-3 Gus Macker tournament later in the month.

== Gallery ==
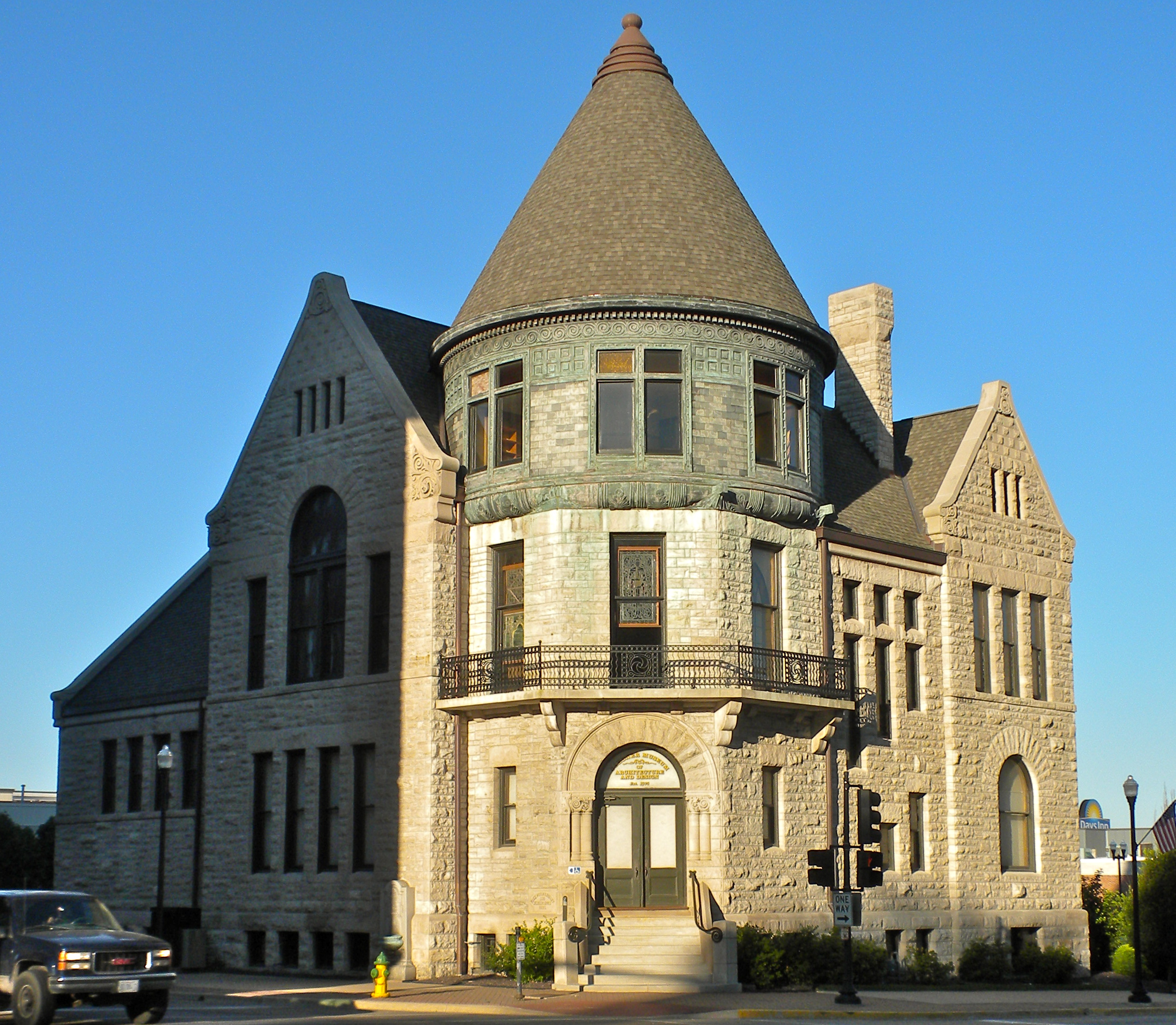
The former Gardner Museum of Architecture and Design

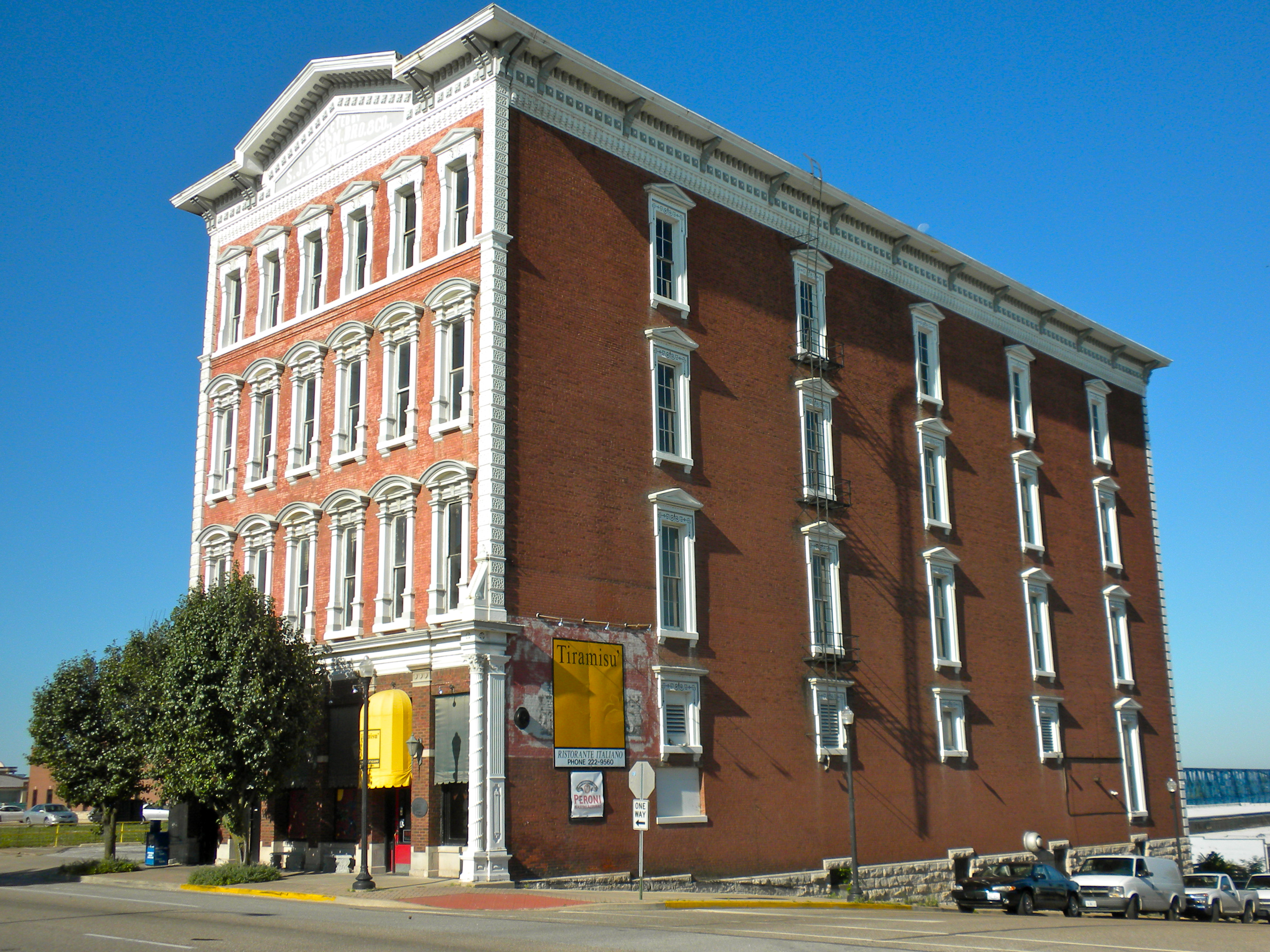
The S.J. Lesem Building

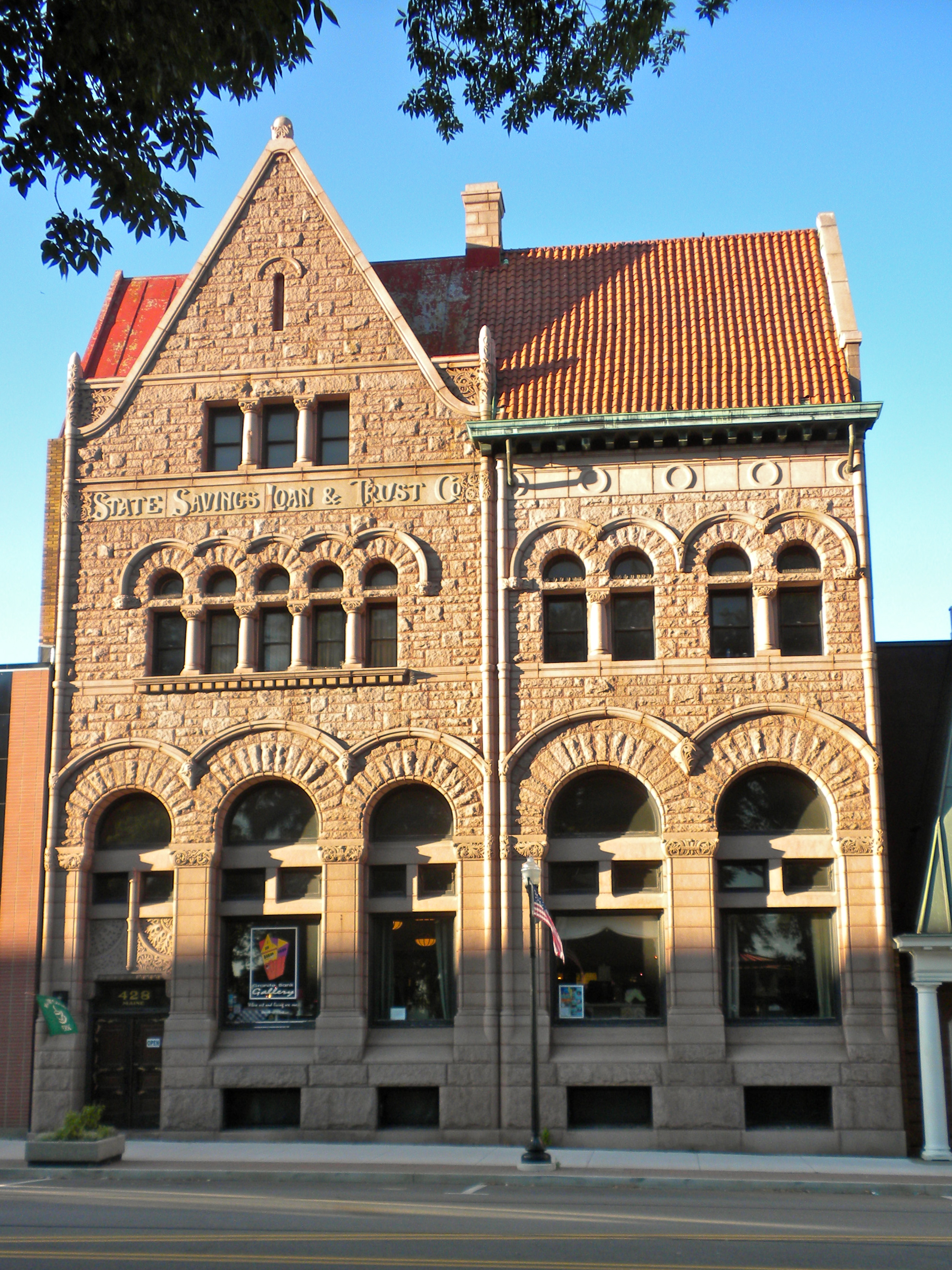
State Savings Loan and Trust

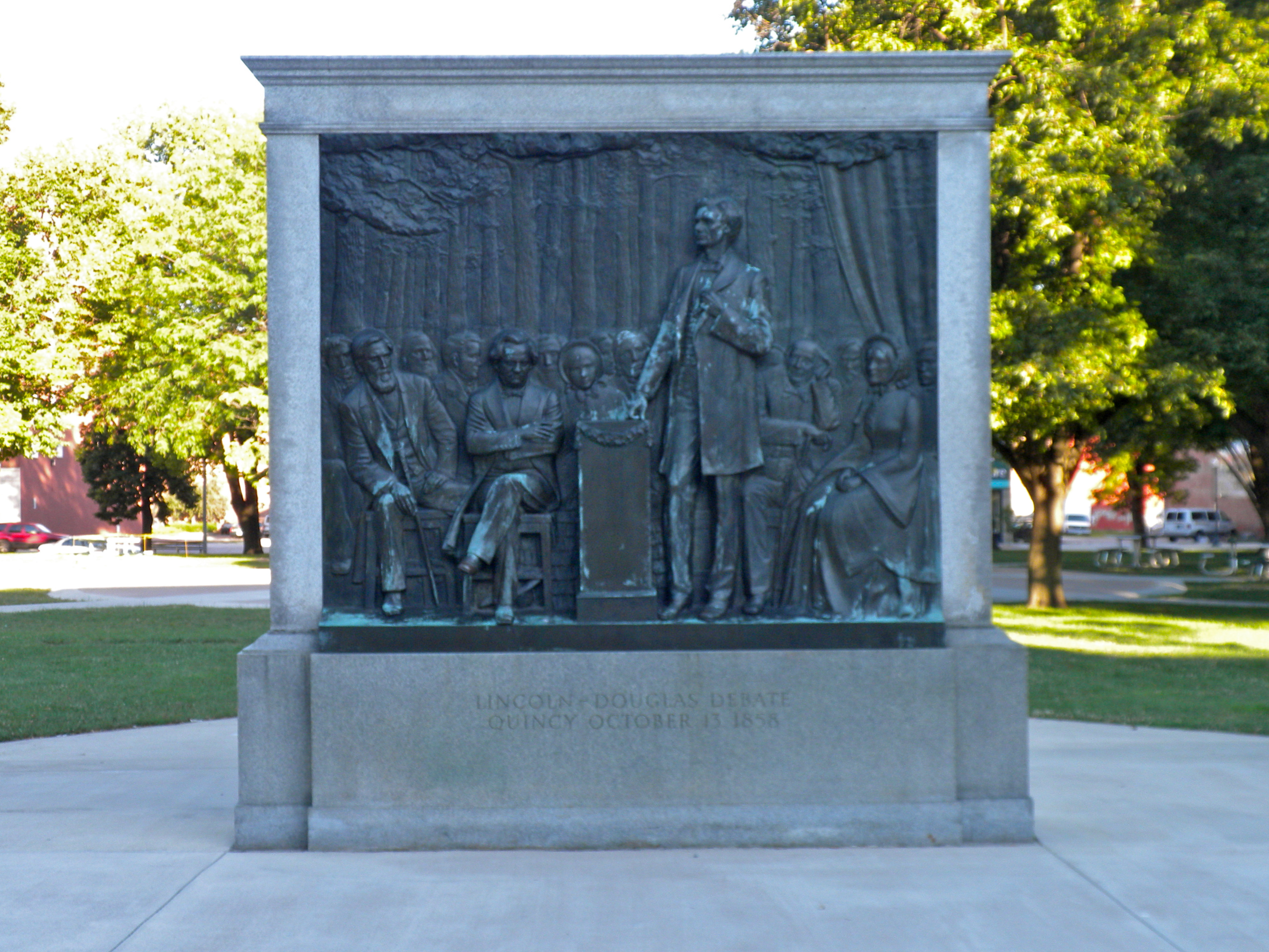
Washington Park

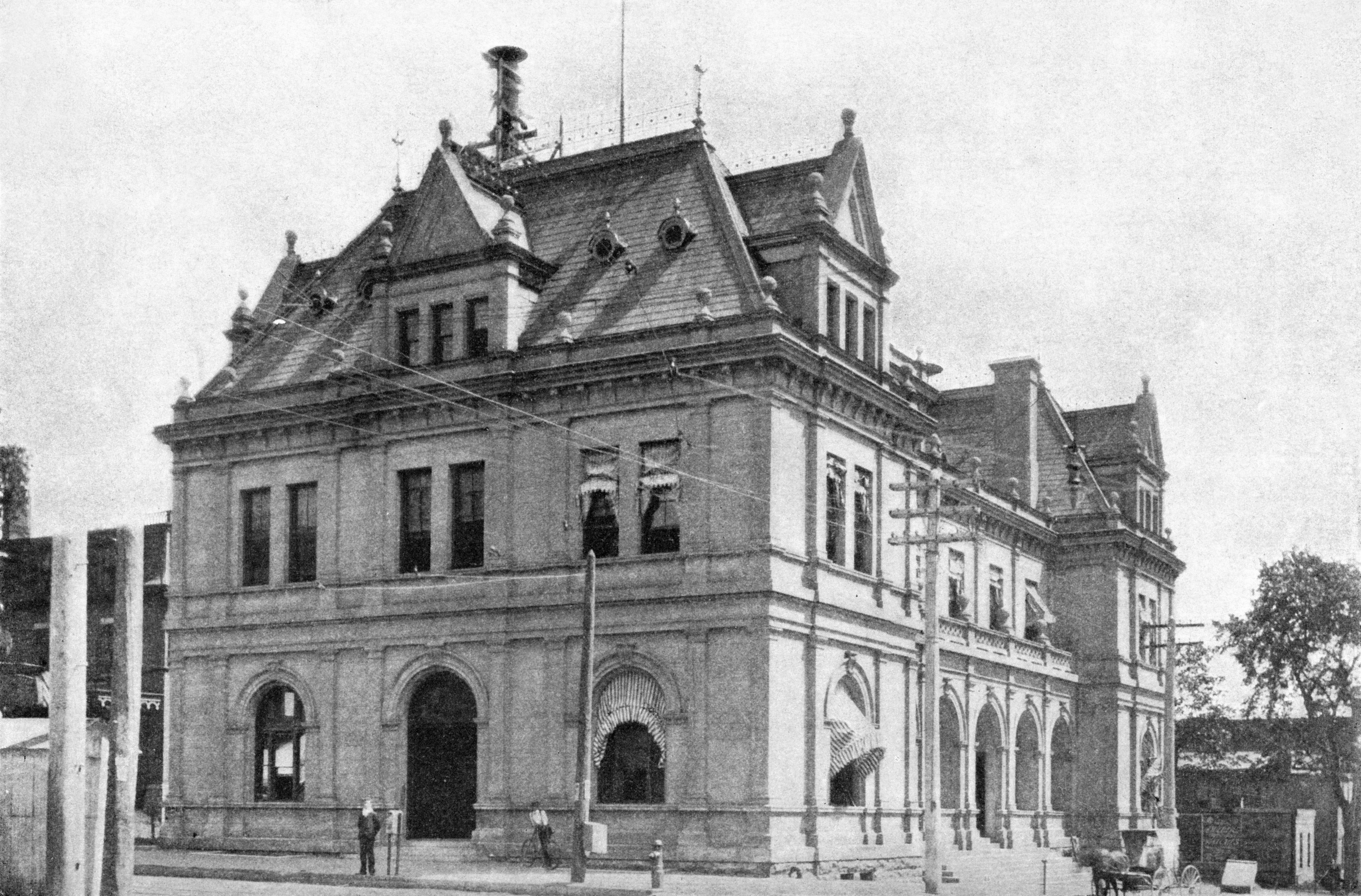
United States Post Office, Quincy

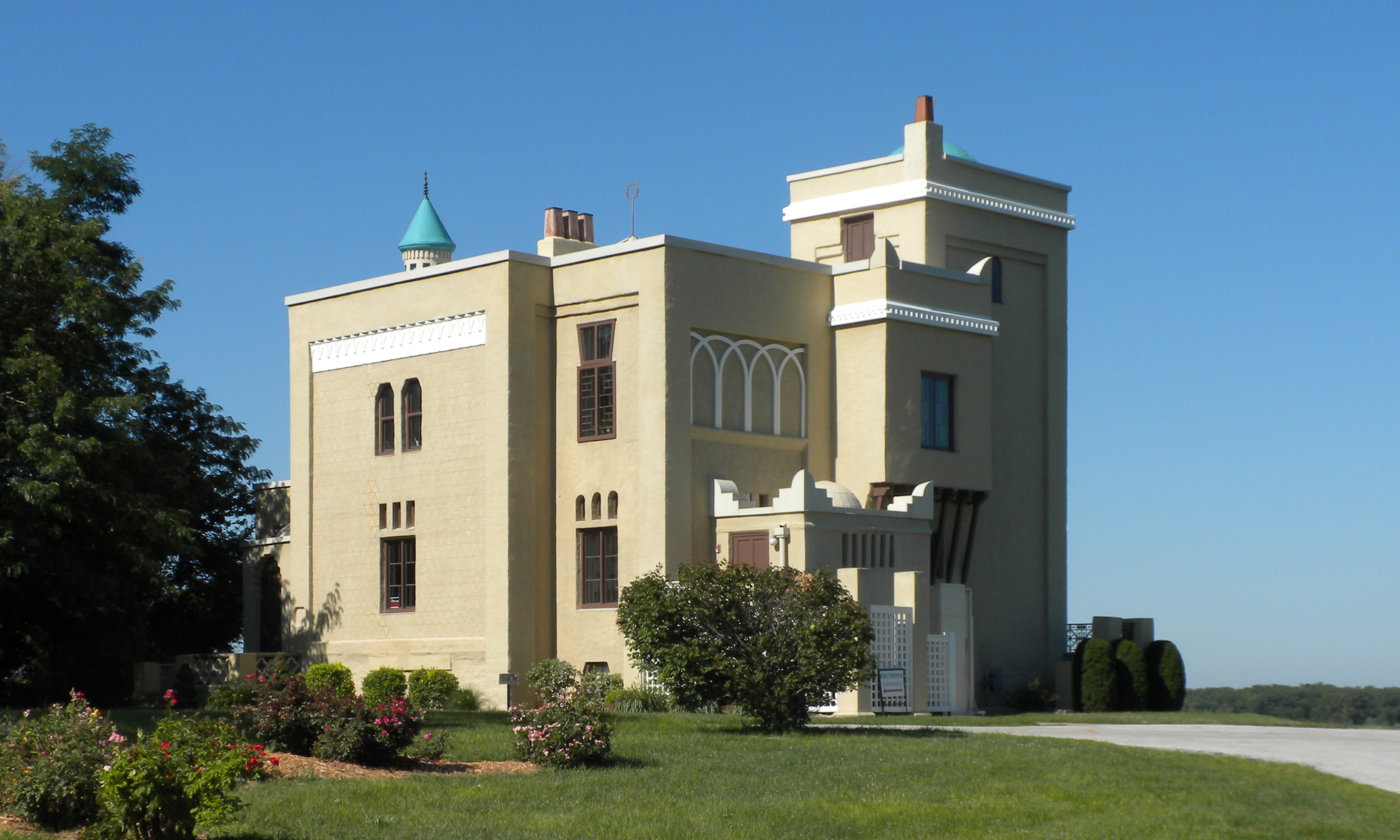
Villa Katherine

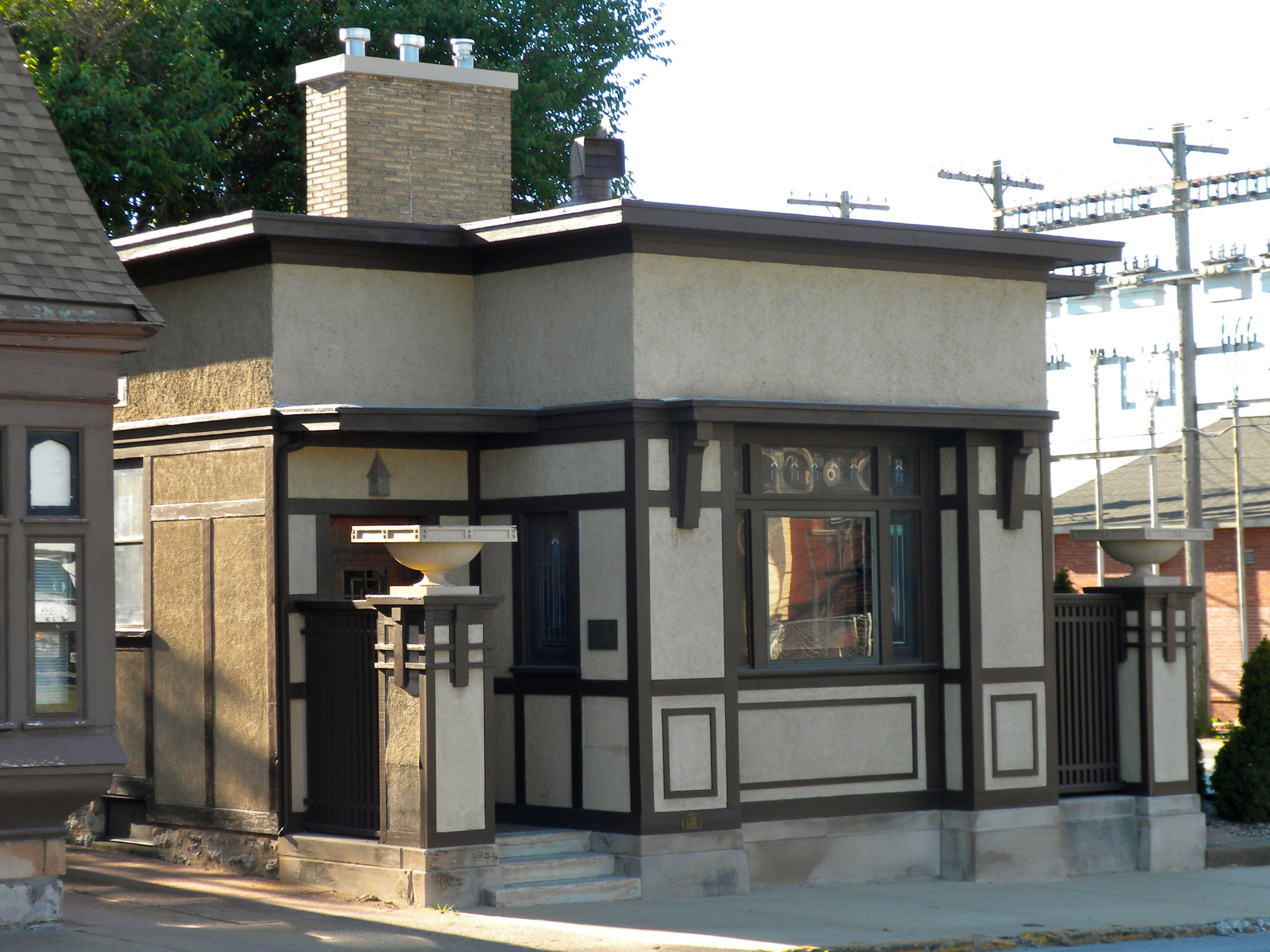
Ernest M. Wood Office and Studio

St. John's Anglican Parish and Cathedral

== See also ==
- South Side German Historic District
