= William F. Gibbs =

American businessman, farmer, and politician

William F. Gibbs (June 15, 1895 – November 27, 1987) was an American businessman, farmer, and politician.

Gibbs was born in Adams County, Illinois. He went to school in Adams County. Gibbs lived with his wife and family in Quincy, Illinois. He was a farmer and was involved in the advertising and manufacturing businesses. Gibbs served in the Illinois House of Representatives from 1937 to 1951 and was a Democrat. Gibbs died at Glenbrook Hospital in Glenview, Illinois.
