= Louise Maertz =

Nurse, writer, and clubwoman (1837–1918)

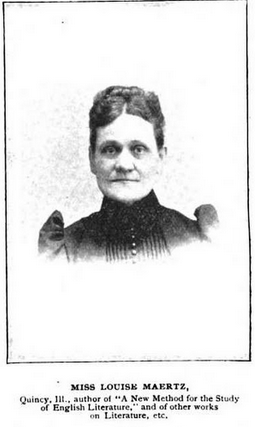
Louise Maertz, in an 1895 publication.

Louise Maertz (c. 1837 — February 4, 1918) was an American Civil War nurse, writer, and clubwoman based in Illinois.

== Early life ==
Louise Maertz was born in Quincy, Illinois, the daughter of Charles Augustus Maertz and Ottilia Obert Maertz. Both of her parents were German immigrants. Louise was sent to Germany for medical treatment at age 18, and toured Europe during that time.

== Career ==
As a young woman during the American Civil War, she volunteered as a nurse, at first locally in Illinois, and then in Helena, Arkansas, and St. Louis, Missouri, among other assignments. She caught malaria in 1863, at an Army hospital in Mississippi. She helped set up the Soldiers' Home in New Orleans. In 1895 she donated money to the Blessing Hospital in Quincy, in memory of her father, for a men's ward.

Maertz wrote several books, including A New Method for the Study of English Literature (1884), and a biography of her father (1903). In 1895, during thirtieth anniversary commemorations of the end of the Civil War, she published a detailed memoir of her time as a nurse with the Union Army.

In 1869, she was a founding member of the "Friends in Council," a women's study club in Quincy. Late in life she served on the board of the Quincy Historical Society, and in that capacity saved the John Wood Mansion from demolition in 1907. She was also active in the Quincy Humane Society.

== Personal life ==
Louise Maertz died in 1918, aged 80 years. There is a plaque in Quincy, Illinois, placed by the Quincy Women's Club, honoring several "Pioneer Women" of the town, including Louise Maertz. At her death, her estate funded the establishment of a "waif's home" for black children in Quincy.
