= South Side German Historic District =

Historic district in Illinois, United States

- U.S. National Register of Historic Places
- U.S. Historic district
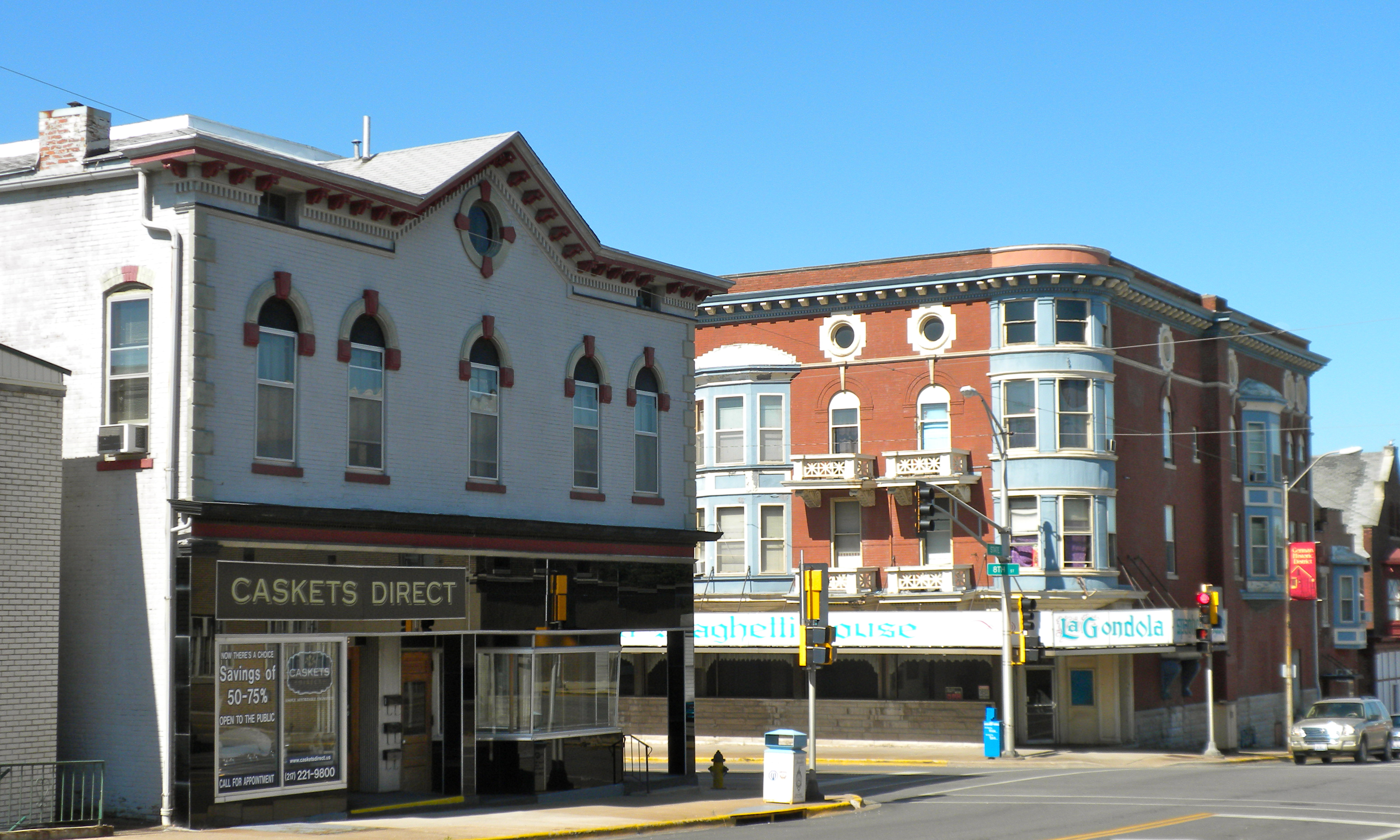
- The intersection of Eighth and State looking west.

- Location within Illinois
- Location: Quincy, Illinois
- Coordinates: 39°55′35.6″N 91°24′11.8″W
- Built: Early-to-Mid 19th Century
- Architect: Multiple
- Architectural style: German, Late Victorian, Mid 19th Century Revival, Late 19th And Early 20th Century American Movements
- NRHP reference No.: 92000484; 95000481 (boundary increase)
- Added to NRHP: 1992

The South Side German Historic District is a neighborhood within Quincy, Illinois, United States just south of downtown. The neighborhood includes most of Quincy's rich German architecture. The region is also widely known as "Calftown", named for the number of calves once owned by its inhabitants. It was added into the National Register of Historic Places in 1992 with a boundary increase in 1995.

== Notable Structures and Attractions ==
=== Dick Brothers Brewery Building ===
9th and York Street

In 1857, three brothers; Matthew, John, and Jacob, founded the Dick Brothers Brewery. At one time, 70,000 barrels of brew would be produced and shipped around the Midwest, making Dick Bros. one of the largest beer brands in the country of the early 20th Century. The company's operations were once even larger than Anheuser-Busch in St. Louis. Prohibition and World War II brought much hardship to the brewery, and the brand declared bankruptcy in 1951. The property was also auctioned off. Today, the building remains as a regional landmark and numerous renovation projects have been started to revitalize the building, including the introduction of a fine art studio. There have even been projects attempting to revive the Dick Brothers brand.

=== Dr. Richard Eells House ===
415 Jersey Street

In 1835, Dr. Richard Eells built his house, which now is part of both the Downtown Quincy Historic District and the South Side German Historic District. Eells was an outspoken abolitionist in his community, offering runaway slaves shelter on their way north. He was found guilty of harboring fugitive slaves in 1842, and his trial was heard by Judge Stephen A. Douglas, of the Lincoln-Douglas debate fame. Following his arrest and trial, he became President of the Illinois Anti-Slavery Party and unsuccessfully ran for the Liberty Party's nomination in the 1844 US presidential election. Today, the home of Dr. Richard Eells has been restored and is maintained by the local organization Friends of Dr. Richard Eells House. They provide tours of the historic house on an appointment basis.

=== Eighth Street Business District ===
8th and State

The Eighth Street Business District (pictured) forms the heart of the South Side German Historic District, and many notable features are along or nearby this interchange including the State Street Theater, Gem City College, and the Salem Evangelical Church.

=== Gem City College ===
700 State

Gem City College is a school that specializes in horology and cosmetology.

=== LaGondola's Spaghetti House ===
LaGondola has moved to a new location at 12th and Jefferson.

=== Quincy Public Library ===
526 Jersey Street

The Quincy Library serves much of the area's literature needs. It is built with a modern design, not a German-influenced one like much of the neighborhood's culture, however the site has become a city landmark regardless. As of 2011, the Library has begun an expansion providing a larger children's and teen section, as well as added more conference spaces for events.

=== Salem Evangelical United Church of Christ ===
435 S. 9th

The Salem Church stands as a prominent feature in Quincy's German historic district. Although not its original location, the church began services in 1848 by a German mission society. It moved to its present location in 1877. The church is also an historical landmark.

=== The State Theater ===
434 South 8th

The State Theater is a former 500-seat movie theater that has been modified to function as a concert venue, reception hall, and bar. The ticket booth is still present and the outside has an array of many incandescent lightbulbs, retained features from its theater roots. State Room opened as a theater in 1938.

=== Woodland Cemetery ===
Woodland Cemetery is one of the oldest cemeteries in the state and is listed on the National Register of Historic Places. The first graves began the cemetery in 1847. It is also placed on the bluffs overlooking the Mississippi River.

== Gallery ==
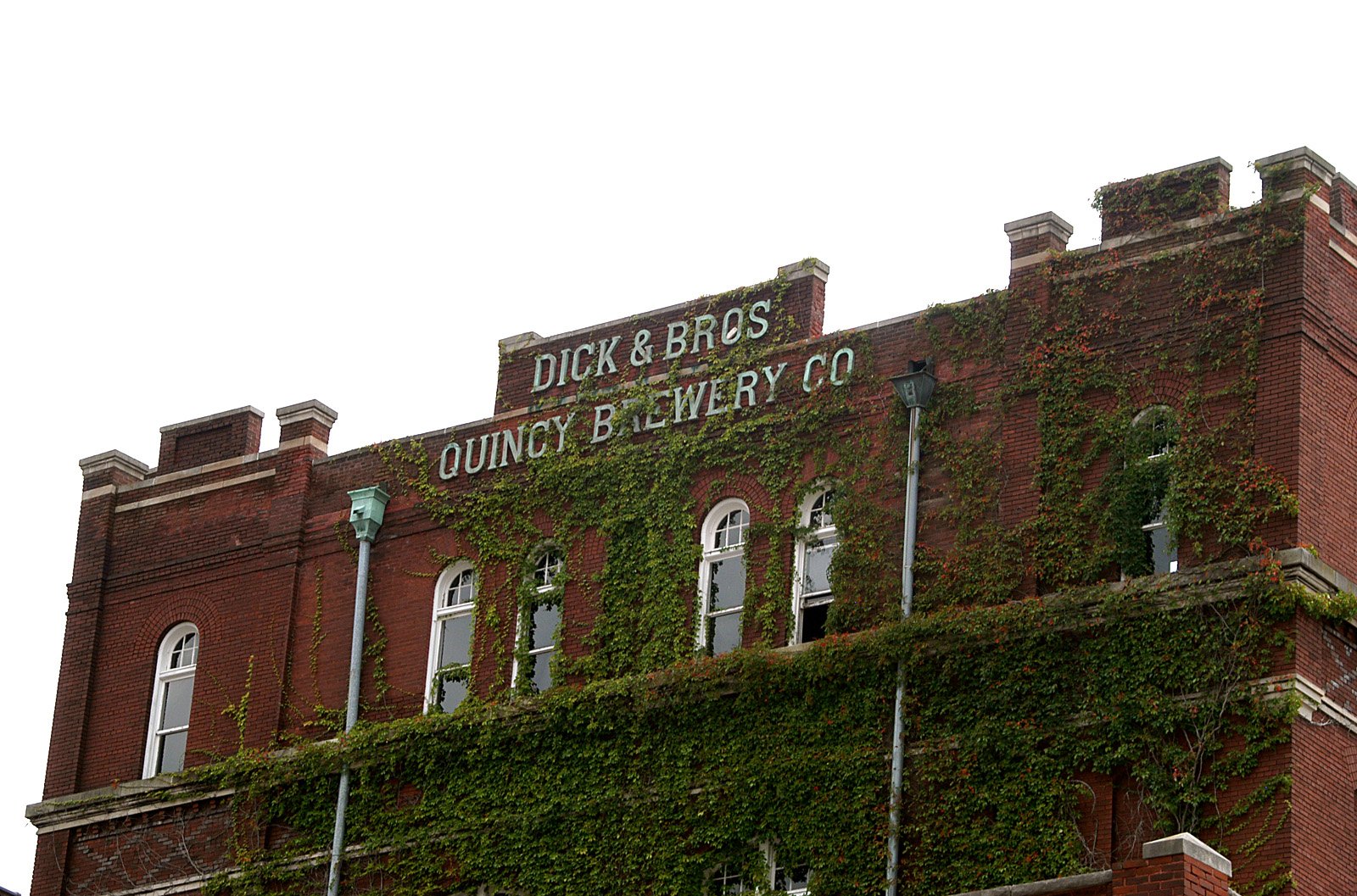
Dick Brothers Brewery Building

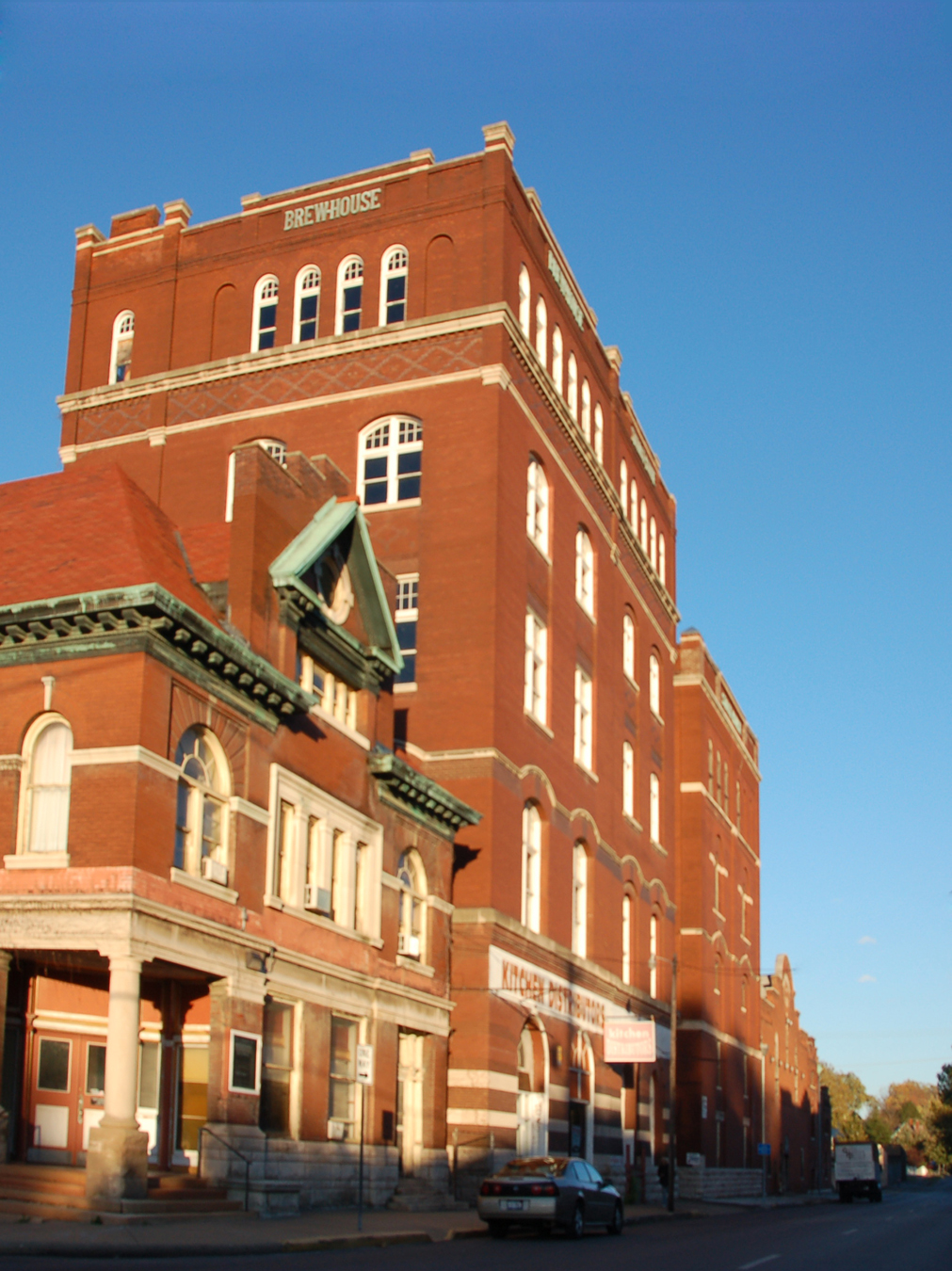
Dick Brothers Brewery Building from 9th and York Streets

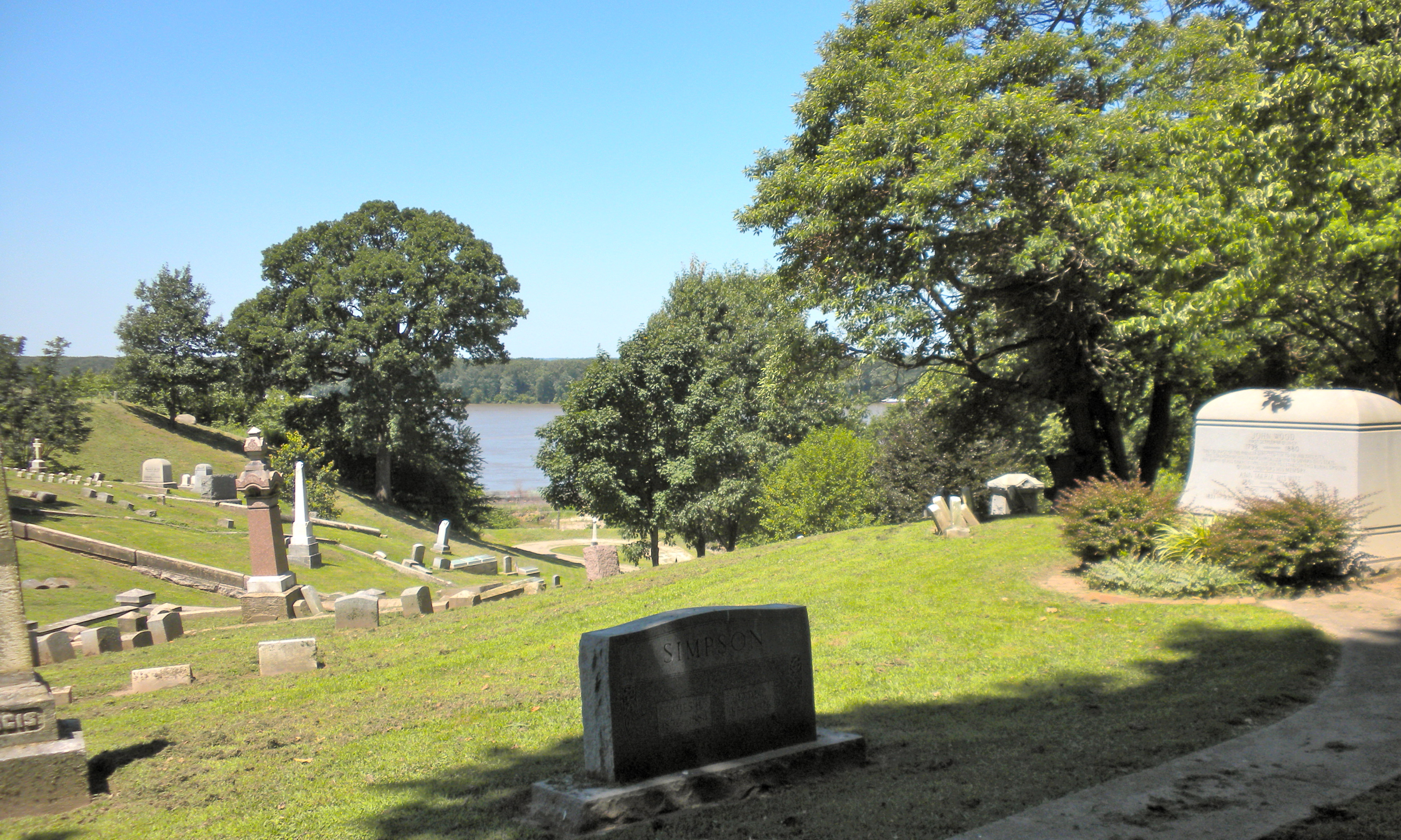
Woodland Cemetery
