= Villa Kathrine =

Historic house in Illinois, United States

- U.S. National Register of Historic Places
- Villa Kathrine exterior in 2020

- Location within Illinois Location within the United States
- Interactive map showing the location of Villa Kathrine
- Location: Quincy, Illinois
- Coordinates: 39°55′33″N 91°24′46″W
- Built: 1900
- Architect: George Behrensmeyer
- Architectural style: Moroccan; Islamic
- NRHP reference No.: 78001110
- Added to NRHP: December 8, 1978

The Villa Kathrine is a Moroccan-style home located on the bluffs overlooking the Mississippi River in Quincy, Illinois. This home is the subject of a local lost treasure story as well as a ghostlore story featuring a dog.

== History ==
The unique home, sometimes branded as a castle, was built in 1900 by architect George Behrensmeyer for wealthy Quincy native W. George Metz. Metz had a fondness for Mediterranean architecture, and used the Villa Kathrine as his home when he was not venturing the world. Metz eventually sold the castle in 1912, and the site fell into disrepair and neglect before the non-profit Friends of the Castle sought to restore the Villa in 1978. Work on restoring the castle was completed in 1998, and appropriate site furnishings have been donated and obtained by staff throughout the years to further enhance the castle's Moroccan roots. Currently, the site functions as the official tourist information center to the City of Quincy and tours are granted of the site on an appointment basis.

Inside, the castle features a harem, a courtyard, and a reflecting pool. Much of the designs for the interior and exterior of the building were based upon W. George Metz's sketches of Islamic architecture that he observed during his global travels.

In 2010, the Villa Kathrine was used as a filming location in the Struber Productions film, Fang, which has yet to be released.
