= National Register of Historic Places listings in Adams County, Illinois =

Location of Adams County in Illinois

This is a list of the National Register of Historic Places listings in Adams County, Illinois.

This is intended to be a complete list of the properties and districts on the National Register of Historic Places in Adams County, Illinois, United States. Latitude and longitude coordinates are provided for many National Register properties and districts; these locations may be seen together in a map.

There are 27 properties and districts listed on the National Register in the county.

This National Park Service list is complete through NPS recent listings posted May 22, 2026.

== Current listings ==
	Name on the Register	Image	Date listed	Location	City or town	Description
1	Coca-Cola Bottling Company Building	Coca-Cola Bottling Company Building	February 7, 1997 (#97000032)	616 N. 24th St. 39°56′18″N 91°22′37″W	Quincy	
2	Downtown Quincy Historic District	Downtown Quincy Historic District	April 7, 1983 (#83000298)	Roughly bounded by Hampshire, Jersey, 4th and 8th Sts. 39°55′57″N 91°24′28″W	Quincy	
3	Ebenezer Methodist Episcopal Chapel and Cemetery	Ebenezer Methodist Episcopal Chapel and Cemetery	June 4, 1984 (#84000921)	Northwest of Golden; 40°09′32″N 91°06′10″W	Golden	
4	Exchange Bank	Exchange Bank	February 12, 1987 (#86003714)	Quincy St. 40°06′26″N 91°04′15″W	Golden	
5	Fall Creek Stone Arch Bridge	Fall Creek Stone Arch Bridge	November 7, 1996 (#96001282)	1.2 miles northeast of Fall Creek-Payson Rd., across Fall Creek; 39°47′28″N 91°17′30″W	Payson	
6	Robert W. Gardner House	Robert W. Gardner House	June 20, 1979 (#79000812)	613 Broadway St. 39°56′09″N 91°24′21″W	Quincy	
7	S.J. Lesem Building	S.J. Lesem Building	November 22, 1999 (#99001377)	135-137 N. 3rd St. 39°56′06″N 91°24′43″W	Quincy	
8	Lewis Round Barn	Lewis Round Barn	January 29, 2003 (#02001750)	2007 E. 1250th St. 40°03′06″N 91°16′19″W	Mendon	Originally listed in 1984 at its original site NW of Clayton, Iowa, reference #84000916. Was removed from the Register in March 2002 due to a pending relocation. The site was recertified with a new reference number in 2003 after successful relocation.
9	Lock and Dam No. 20 Historic District	Lock and Dam No. 20 Historic District	March 10, 2004 (#04000180)	Mississippi River southwest of Meyer; 40°08′38″N 91°30′41″W	Meyer	Extends into Lewis County, Missouri
10	Lock and Dam No. 21 Historic District	Lock and Dam No. 21 Historic District	March 10, 2004 (#04000181)	0.5 miles west of Illinois Route 57; 39°54′22″N 91°25′56″W	Quincy	Extends into Marion County, Missouri
11	Morgan-Wells House	Morgan-Wells House	November 16, 1977 (#77000471)	421 Jersey St. 39°55′52″N 91°24′32″W	Quincy	Demolished by the local newspaper for office expansion in 2017.
12	Richard F. Newcomb House	Richard F. Newcomb House	June 3, 1982 (#82002516)	1601 Maine St. 39°55′56″N 91°23′24″W	Quincy	
13	One Thirty North Eighth Building	One Thirty North Eighth Building	February 9, 1984 (#84000918)	130 N. 8th St. 39°55′58″N 91°24′10″W	Quincy	
14	Quincy East End Historic District	Quincy East End Historic District	November 14, 1985 (#85002791)	Roughly bounded by Hampshire, 24th, State, and 12th Sts. 39°55′51″N 91°23′11″W	Quincy	
15	Quincy National Cemetery	Quincy National Cemetery	May 6, 2011 (#11000242)	36th and Maine Sts. 39°55′58″N 91°21′25″W	Quincy	Civil War Era National Cemeteries MPS
16	Quincy Northwest Historic District	Quincy Northwest Historic District	May 11, 2000 (#00000414)	Roughly bounded by Broadway, N. 2nd, Locust, and N. 12th Sts. 39°56′43″N 91°24′18″W	Quincy	
17	John Roy Site	John Roy Site	May 22, 1978 (#78001109)	Southwest of the junction of 1700th Ave. and 2950th St. 39°59′56″N 90°56′59″W	Clayton	
18	South Side German Historic District	South Side German Historic District	May 22, 1992 (#92000484)	Roughly bounded by 6th, 12th, Washington, Jersey and York Sts.; also roughly bounded by Jefferson, S. 12th, Jackson and S. 5th Sts. 39°55′33″N 91°24′07″W	Quincy	Second set of boundaries represents a boundary increase of April 20, 1995
19	State Savings Loan and Trust	State Savings Loan and Trust	March 23, 1979 (#79000813)	428 Maine St. 39°55′55″N 91°24′32″W	Quincy	
20	F. D. Thomas House	F. D. Thomas House	July 28, 1983 (#83000299)	331 N. Ohio St. 40°02′50″N 91°03′51″W	Camp Point	
21	U.S. Post Office and Courthouse	U.S. Post Office and Courthouse	December 2, 1977 (#77000472)	200 N. 8th St. 39°56′01″N 91°24′10″W	Quincy	
22	Ursa Town Hall	Ursa Town Hall	March 1, 2002 (#02000095)	109 S. Warsaw St. 40°04′25″N 91°22′00″W	Ursa	
23	Villa Kathrine	Villa Kathrine	December 8, 1978 (#78001110)	532 S. 3rd 39°55′33″N 91°24′46″W	Quincy	
24	William S. Warfield House	William S. Warfield House	March 21, 1979 (#79000814)	1624 Maine St. 39°55′53″N 91°23′23″W	Quincy	
25	Ernest M. Wood Office and Studio	Ernest M. Wood Office and Studio	August 12, 1982 (#82002517)	126 N. 8th St. 39°55′57″N 91°24′10″W	Quincy	
26	John Wood Mansion	John Wood Mansion	April 17, 1970 (#70000228)	425 S. 12th St. 39°55′39″N 91°23′45″W	Quincy	
27	Woodland Cemetery	Woodland Cemetery	March 1, 2002 (#02000096)	1020 S. 5th St. 39°55′01″N 91°12′55″W	Quincy	

== See also ==
- List of National Historic Landmarks in Illinois
- National Register of Historic Places listings in Illinois
