= Unity High School (Mendon, Illinois) =

Public high school in Mendon, Illinois, US

Location
- 453 West Collins Street; Mendon, Adams County, Illinois 62351; United States
- 40.090°N 91.290°W

Information
- Type: Comprehensive Public High School
- School district: Mendon Community Unit School District 4
- Principal: Seth Klusmeyer
- Teaching staff: 17.36
- Grades: 9-12
- Enrollment: 180 (2023-2024)
- Student to teacher ratio: 10.37
- Campus type: Rural, fringe
- Colors: Maroon, White, Columbia Blue
- Athletics conference: West Central
- Mascot: Mustang
- Website: Official website

Unity High School, also known as Mendon Unity, or UHS, is a public four-year high school located at 453 West Collins Street in Mendon, Illinois, a village in Adams County, Illinois, in the Midwestern United States. UHS serves the communities of Mendon, Fowler, Lima, Loraine, Marcelline, Meyer, and Ursa. The campus is located 15 miles northeast of Quincy, Illinois, and serves a mixed village and rural residential community.

== History ==
Unity High School was formed in 1948 by the consolidation of four high schools: Lima High School, Ursa High School, Mendon High School and Loraine High School.

== Athletics ==
Unity High School competes in the West Central Conference and is a member school in the Illinois High School Association. The UHS mascot is the Mustang, with school colors of maroon, white, and Columbia blue. Due to their small enrollment, they combine for football with Payson-Seymour High School.
