= Camp Point (disambiguation) =

Camp Point, Illinois is a village in Adams County, Illinois, United States.

Camp point or Camp Point may also refer to:

- Camp Point Township, Adams County, Illinois
- Laager Point, a headland in the South Shetland Islands, Antarctica
- Lægerneset, a headland on the eastern side of Recherche Fjord, Svalbard
- Camp point (lagpunkt), a work location or a subcamp of a Gulag labor camp
