= Lima Township =

Lima Township may refer to:

- Lima Township, Adams County, Illinois
- Lima Township, LaGrange County, Indiana
- Lima Township, Michigan
- Lima Township, Cass County, Minnesota
- Lima Township, Licking County, Ohio, now part of the city of Pataskala

== See also ==
- Rock Creek-Lima Township, Carroll County, Illinois
