= Ernest M. Wood =

Architect based in Quincy, Illinois, United States

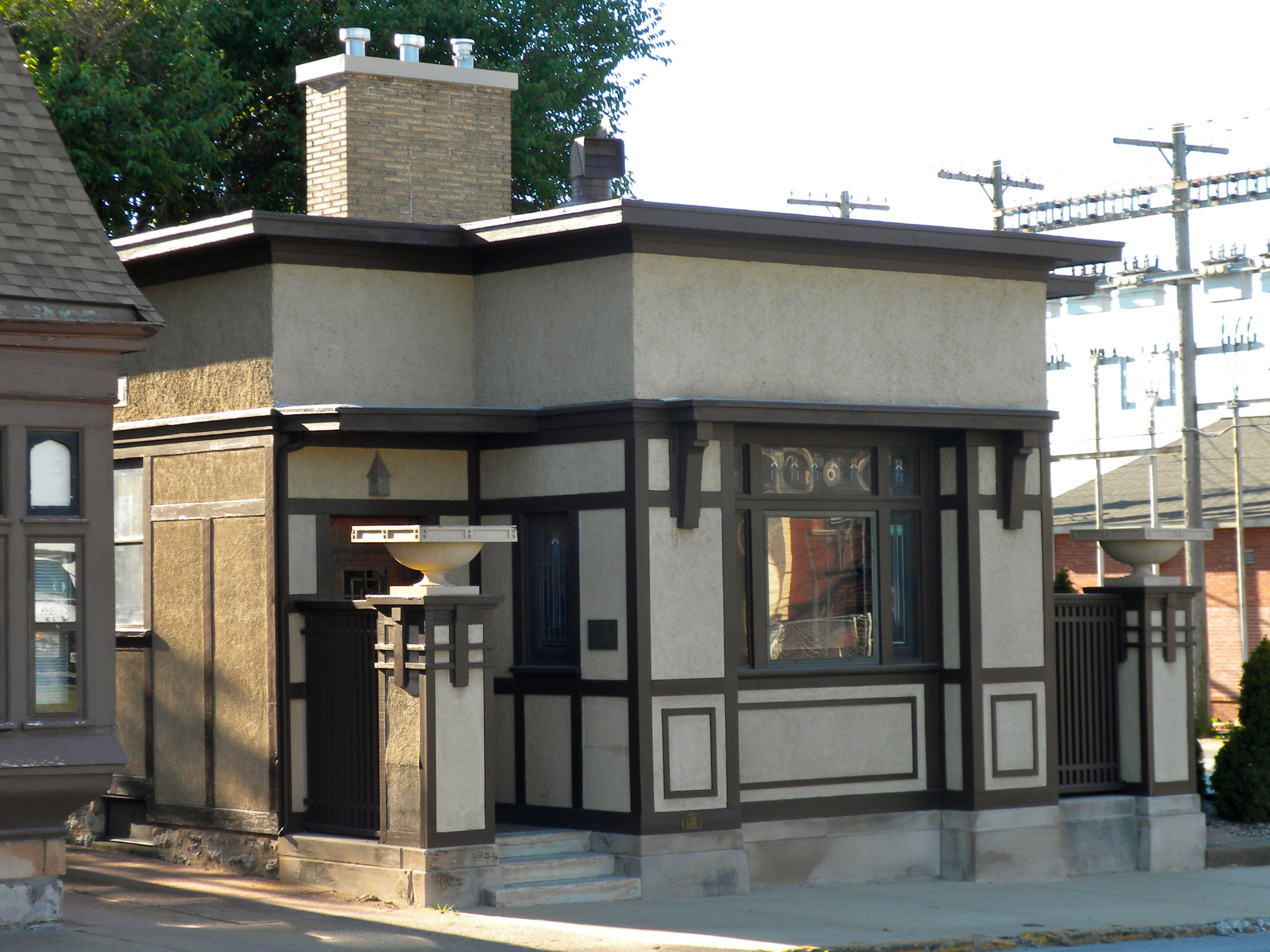
Wood's office and studio in Quincy

Ernest Michael Wood (June 17, 1863–January 25, 1956) was an architect based in Quincy, Illinois. A Quincy native, Wood entered into architecture in 1886 as a draftsman of Quincy architect Harvey Chatten. Wood remained in Chatten's practice until 1891, when he opened his own practice; collaborative works by the two include the Richard F. Newcomb House, a Richardsonian Romanesque home completed in 1891. During the early part of his career, Wood mainly designed buildings in popular period styles; examples of this period of his work include the 1900 Tudor Revival One Thirty North Eighth Building and his 1906 addition to the Romanesque State Savings Loan and Trust Company building. In the 1900s, though, Wood began to study the work of Frank Lloyd Wright and the Prairie School. Wood corresponded with Wright, and his work is largely responsible for introducing the Prairie School to the Quincy region. Wood's office and studio, which he completed in 1911, was his first major Prairie School work and his introduction of the design to Quincy. In addition to his work in Quincy proper, Wood also designed Prairie School homes in Camp Point and Warsaw in Illinois and Hannibal and Palmyra in Missouri.

== Significant works ==
Several of Wood's works have been listed on the National Register of Historic Places:

- Richard F. Newcomb House, Quincy, IL (1890–91, Romanesque Revival, with Harvey Chatten)
- One Thirty North Eighth Building, Quincy, IL (1900, Tudor Revival)
- Addition to the State Savings Loan and Trust Company, Quincy, IL (1906, Romanesque Revival)
- Ernest M. Wood Office and Studio, Quincy, IL (1911, Prairie School)
- F. D. Thomas House, Camp Point, IL (1917, Prairie School)
