= Marcelline, Illinois =

- Unincorporated community Census designated place
- Location within Illinois Location within the United States
- Coordinates: 40°07′07″N 91°22′06″W
- Country: United States
- State: Illinois
- County: Adams
- Township: Ursa

Area
  - Total: 0.050 sq mi (0.13 km^{2})
  - Land: 0.050 sq mi (0.13 km^{2})
  - Water: 0 sq mi (0.00 km^{2})
- Elevation: 617 ft (188 m)

Population (2020)
  - Total: 75
  - Density: 1,508.6/sq mi (582.48/km^{2})
- Time zone: UTC-6 (Central (CST))
  - Summer (DST): UTC-5 (CDT)
- ZIP code: 62376 (Ursa)
- Area code: 217
- FIPS code: 1746734
- GNIS feature ID: 2804087

Marcelline is an unincorporated community and census designated place (CDP) in northwest Ursa Township, Adams County, Illinois, United States. As of the 2020 census, Marcelline had a population of 75.

Marcelline is located on Illinois Route 96 four miles north of Ursa and five miles south of Lima. Bear Creek flows past approximately two miles to the north.

== Demographics ==
Marcelline first appeared as a census designated place in the 2020 U.S. census.
