= Ursa Creek =

Stream in northwest Illinois

Ursa Creek is a stream in northwest Adams County, Illinois and is a tributary of the Mississippi River. The stream headwaters arise at 40°4′42″N 91°16′19″W southeast of the community of Mendon adjacent to the west side of Illinois Route 336 and it flows west passing south of Mendon to pass under Illinois Route 96 just south of the community of Ursa. It continues to the west to enter the Mississippi floodplain at 40°4′34″N 91°23′46″W where it is channelized as the Rock and Ursa Creek Diversion Channel to enter the Mississippi across from La Grange, Missouri.
