= Mendon Community Unit School District 4 =

School district in Illinois, United States

Address
- 453 West Collins Street Mendon, Illinois, 62351; United States

District information
- Grades: PK–12
- Superintendent: Scott D. Riddle
- Schools: 3
- NCES District ID: 1725590

Students and staff
- Students: 669 (2023–2024)
- Teachers: 55.17 (on an FTE basis)
- Student–teacher ratio: 12.13:1

Other information
- Website: www.cusd4.com

Mendon Community Unit School District 4 is a unified school district that is mostly located in Mendon, a village located in Adams County, Illinois. It is composed of Unity Elementary School, Unity Middle School, and Unity High School. The current superintendent of the district is Scott D. Riddle.

== List of Principals ==
- Bill Behrends, principal of Unity High School
- Josh Arnsman, principal of Unity Middle School
- Brook Durham, principal of Unity Elementary School
