= Northeast Township =

Northeast Township may refer to the following townships in the United States:

- Northeast Township, Adams County, Illinois
- Northeast Township, Orange County, Indiana

== See also ==
- Northeast Madison Township, Pennsylvania
