= Arthur S. Nevins =

United States Army general

Arthur Seymour Nevins
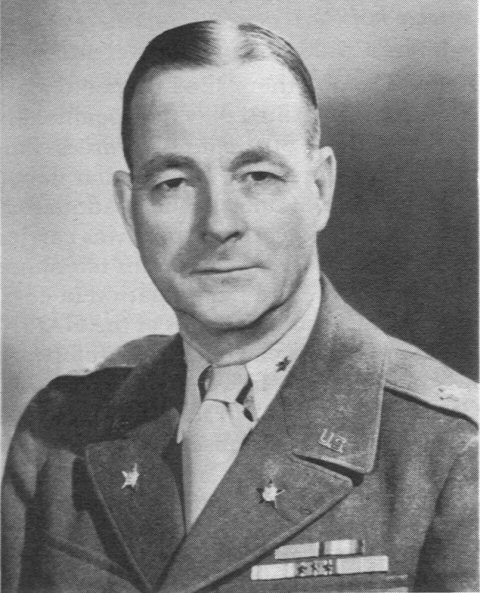
- Born: July 19, 1891; Camp Point, Illinois, U.S.
- Died: January 19, 1979 (aged 87); San Antonio, Texas, U.S.
- Burial place: Gettysburg National Cemetery
- Military career
- Allegiance: United States of America
- Branch: United States Army
- Service years: 1917–1946
- Rank: Brigadier General
- Conflicts: World War I World War II
- Awards: Distinguished Service Medal; Legion of Merit (2); Bronze Star Medal; Order of the Red Banner (Union of Soviet Socialist Republics)
- Other work: Author

Brigadier General Arthur Seymour Nevins (July 19, 1891–January 19, 1979) was a career army officer; a close friend of Dwight D. Eisenhower; and the manager of the Eisenhower's Gettysburg Farm.

Nevins was born in Illinois, and was a brother of Allan Nevins, the noted historian. He joined the Army in 1917 and served under Dwight D. Eisenhower in the Philippines in the 1930s and in North Africa and Europe during World War II. Nevins retired from the Army in 1946 but continued to have frequent contacts with Dwight D. Eisenhower.

In 1950 Dwight D. and Mamie Eisenhower bought a 189-acre (0.76 km^{2}) farm adjacent to the Gettysburg Battlefield, intending to use it as a place to live when they retired. Eisenhower was preparing to leave for Europe where he had been appointed Supreme Commander of NATO forces, so he hired Nevins to manage the farm for him. Nevins moved to Gettysburg in April 1951 and managed Eisenhower's farm until Eisenhower retired from the presidency in 1961. Nevins settled on an adjoining farm and remained a close friend of Eisenhower until Eisenhower's death in 1969.

Soon after Eisenhower's death, General Nevins began to write a book about their friendship. In 1972 he provided the Eisenhower Presidential Library with a copy of the rough draft of the manuscript, which he had titled "Looking Back Over More Than Fifty Years of Friendship With General Eisenhower." The book was eventually published in 1977 by Carlton Press of New York City under the title "Gettysburg’s Five-Star Farmer."
