= Ebenezer Methodist Episcopal Chapel and Cemetery =

Historic church in Illinois, United States

- U.S. National Register of Historic Places
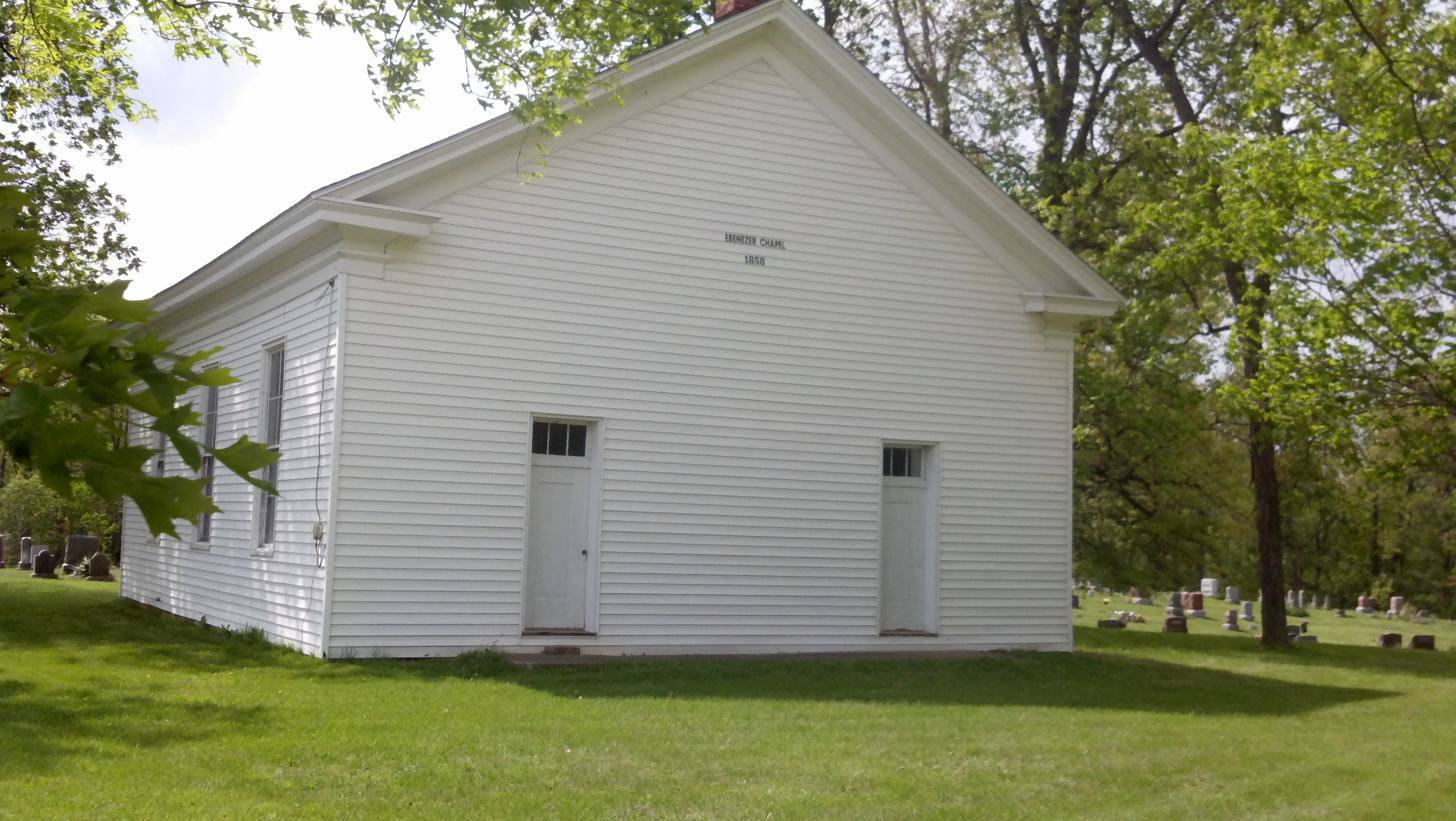

- Location within Illinois Location within the United States
- Location: NW of Golden, Golden, Illinois
- Coordinates: 40°9′31″N 91°6′9″W
- Area: 5 acres (2.0 ha)
- Built: 1858
- NRHP reference No.: 84000921
- Added to NRHP: June 4, 1984

The Ebenezer Methodist Episcopal Chapel and Cemetery is a historic church located northwest of Golden, Adams County, Illinois. The church was built in 1858–59 for the local Methodist Episcopal congregation.

== Architecture ==
The church was built in 1858–59 for the local Methodist Episcopal congregation. The church has a vernacular Greek Revival design; while the style was common in Illinois before the Civil War, the church is now the only one of its type in the county. The church is a white sided building on a limestone foundation; it is topped by a gable roof with a simple entablature at either end. It was built from local timber and hand-hewn with adzes.

The interior holds pews in a U-shape, and seating was originally separated by gender. It contains two pot-belly stoves, a pulpit, and a piano.

The church's cemetery, located to the west of the building, has had burials since 1857 and contains both members and non-members of the church.

The church is located in a remote rural setting, nearly two miles on unpaved roads from the nearest highway. There is no heat, indoor plumbing, or electricity.

== History ==
On October 5, 1858, "George W. Foss, deputy surveyor for the county of Adams, surveyed a tract of land in section 16, belonging to William Willard, for the purpose of transferring it over to a society known as the Ebenezer Chapel Society of the Methodist Episcopal Church."

On September 23, 1859, the deed was written by Thomas Crawford, justice of the peace in Houston Township, for the Ebenezer Society for the price of one dollar. The first trustees of the society were elected on December 10, 1858.

In 1893, the Ebenezer Burial Ground Association was formed. An additional tract north of the property was purchased to expand the cemetery. In 1925, both cemetery yards were governed by one set of trustees.

Ebenezer Chapel Society of the Methodist Episcopal Church was active for nearly a century before merging with Centennial Methodist Church in 1955. The combined congregation currently holds services at the Centennial church, except for the Sunday before Memorial Day which is held in the old Ebenezer Chapel.

In 1982, the chapel was in need of repair. A new non-profit was formed called Ebenezer Chapel and Burial Society.

The church was added to the National Register of Historic Places on June 4, 1984. It is one of two sites on the National Register in Golden, the other being the Exchange Bank.

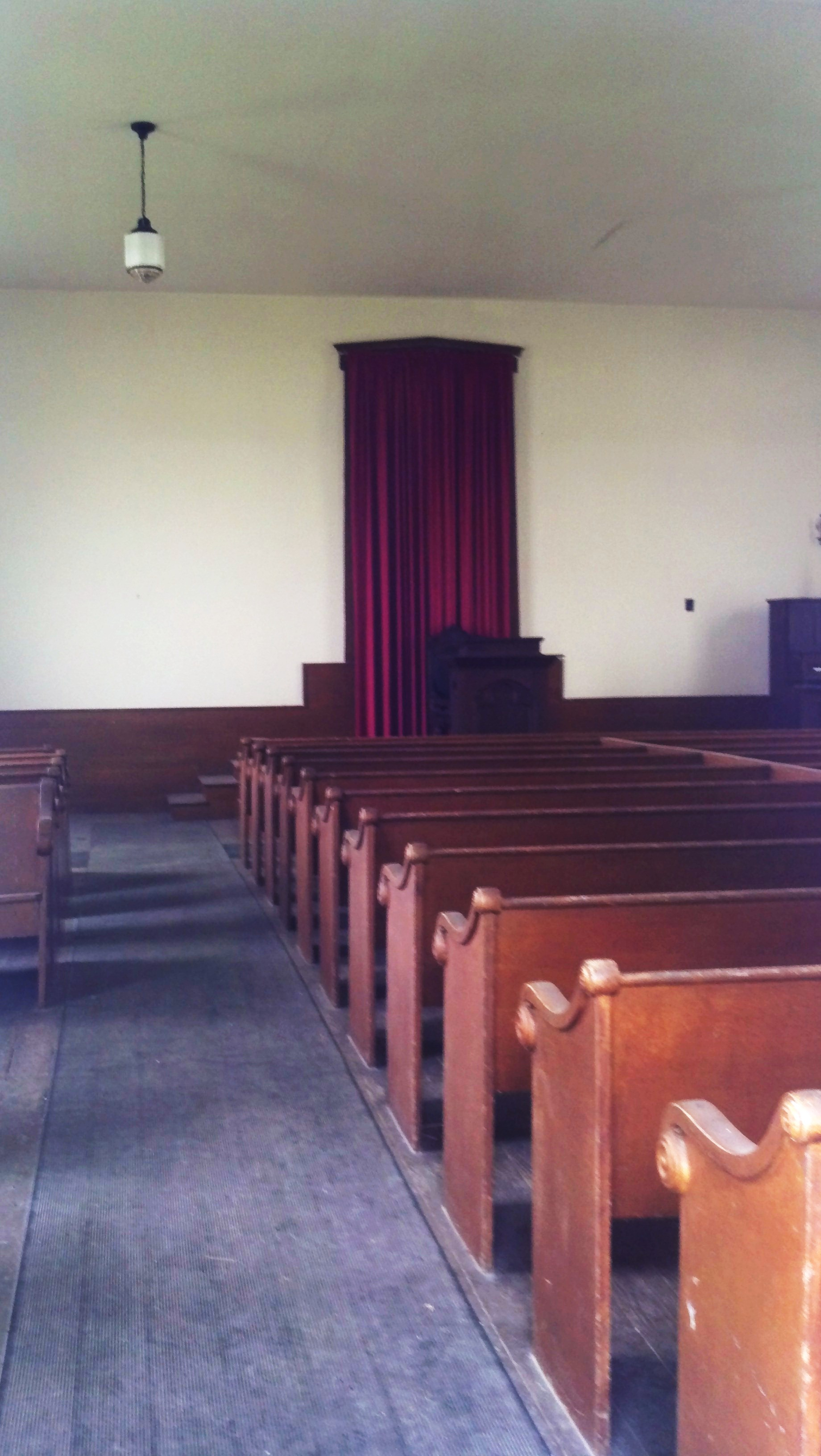
Interior of the chapel
