= Tesha Buss =

American politician from Vermont

Member of the Vermont House of Representatives from the Windsor-5 District district
- Incumbent
- Assumed office January 4, 2023

Personal details
- Born: Golden, Illinois
- Party: Democratic
- Education: Illinois Wesleyan University

Tesha Buss is an American politician from Vermont. She has been a Democratic member of the Vermont House of Representatives for the Windsor-5 District since 2023.

Buss was born in Golden, Illinois and grew up on a dairy farm.
