= Lock and Dam No. 20 =

Dam in Illinois and Missouri, U.S.

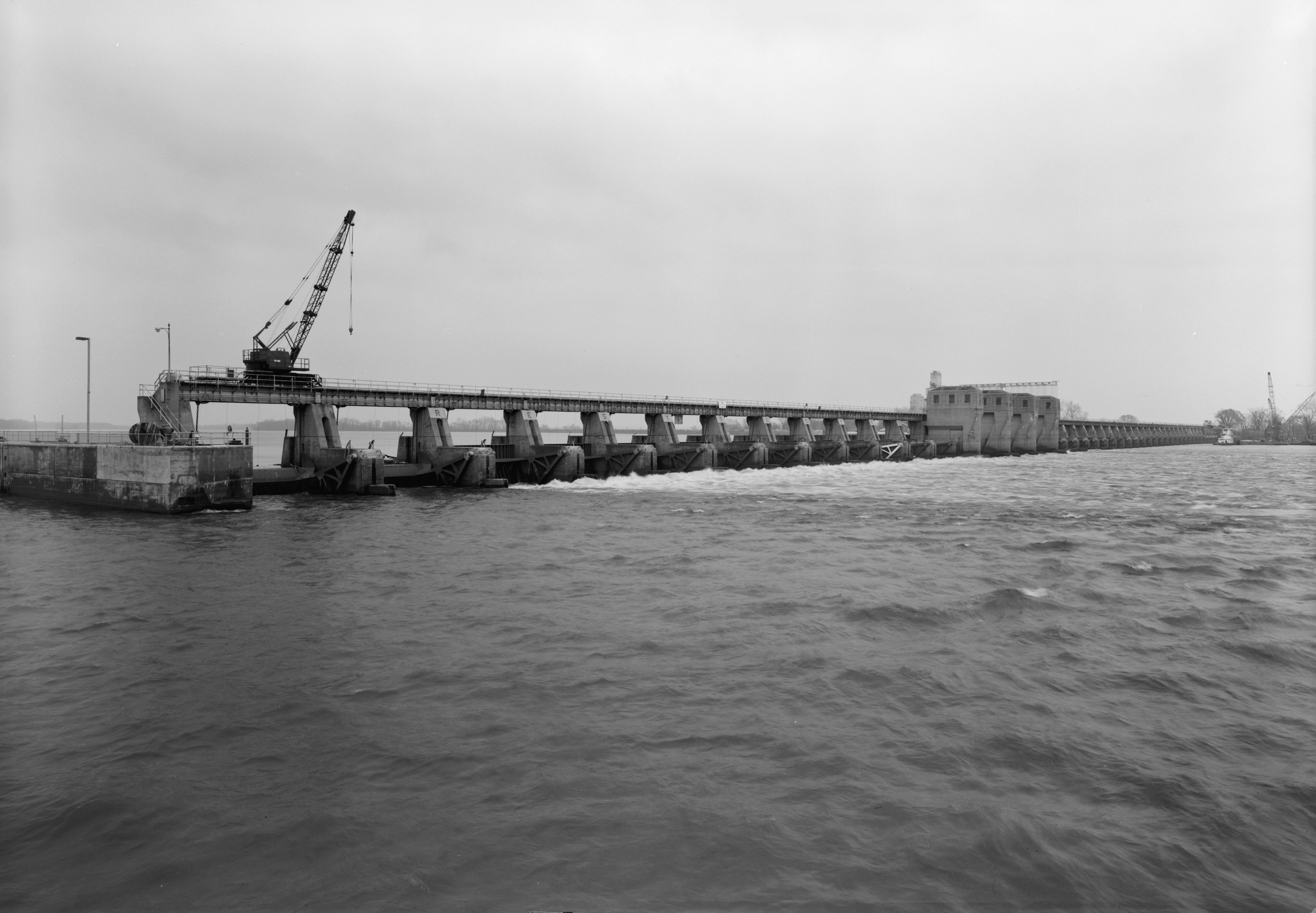
- Mississippi River Lock and Dam number 20
- Interactive map of Lock and Dam No. 20
- Country: United States
- Location: Lima Township, Adams County, Illinois / Canton Township, Lewis County, Missouri, near Meyer, Illinois and Canton, Missouri
- Coordinates: 40°8′39″N 91°30′36″W
- Construction began: 1932
- Opening date: November 20, 1935
- Construction cost: US$4.45 million
- Operators: U.S. Army Corps of Engineers, Rock Island District

Dam and spillways
- Impounds: Upper Mississippi River
- Length: 2,369 feet (722 m)

Reservoir
- Creates: Pool 20
- Total capacity: 58,000 acre⋅ft (0.072 km^{3})
- Catchment area: 134,300 mi^{2} (348,000 km^{2})
- Lock and Dam No. 20 Historic District
- U.S. National Register of Historic Places
- U.S. Historic district
- Location within Missouri Location within the United States
- Location: 1/2 mi (800 m) N of Henderson St, Canton, Missouri
- Area: 83.9 acres (34.0 ha)
- Built: 1935
- Architect: US Army Corps of Engineers; Abbott, Edwin E.
- MPS: Upper Mississippi River 9-Foot Navigation Project MPS
- NRHP reference No.: 04000180
- Added to NRHP: March 10, 2004

Lock and Dam No. 20 is a lock and dam located on the Upper Mississippi River, the lock side in Canton, Missouri and the dam crossing to Meyer, Illinois.

The structure is located at river mile 343.1. It includes a 2,369 feet (722 m) long dam, 40 tainter gates, 3 roller gates, and a lock chamber that is 110 feet (34 m) wide by 600 feet (183 m) long. There is also an incomplete auxiliary lock. In 2004, the facility was listed in the National Register of Historic Places as Lock and Dam No. 20 Historic District, #04000180 covering 839 acres (340 ha), 1 building, 6 structures, 3 objects.

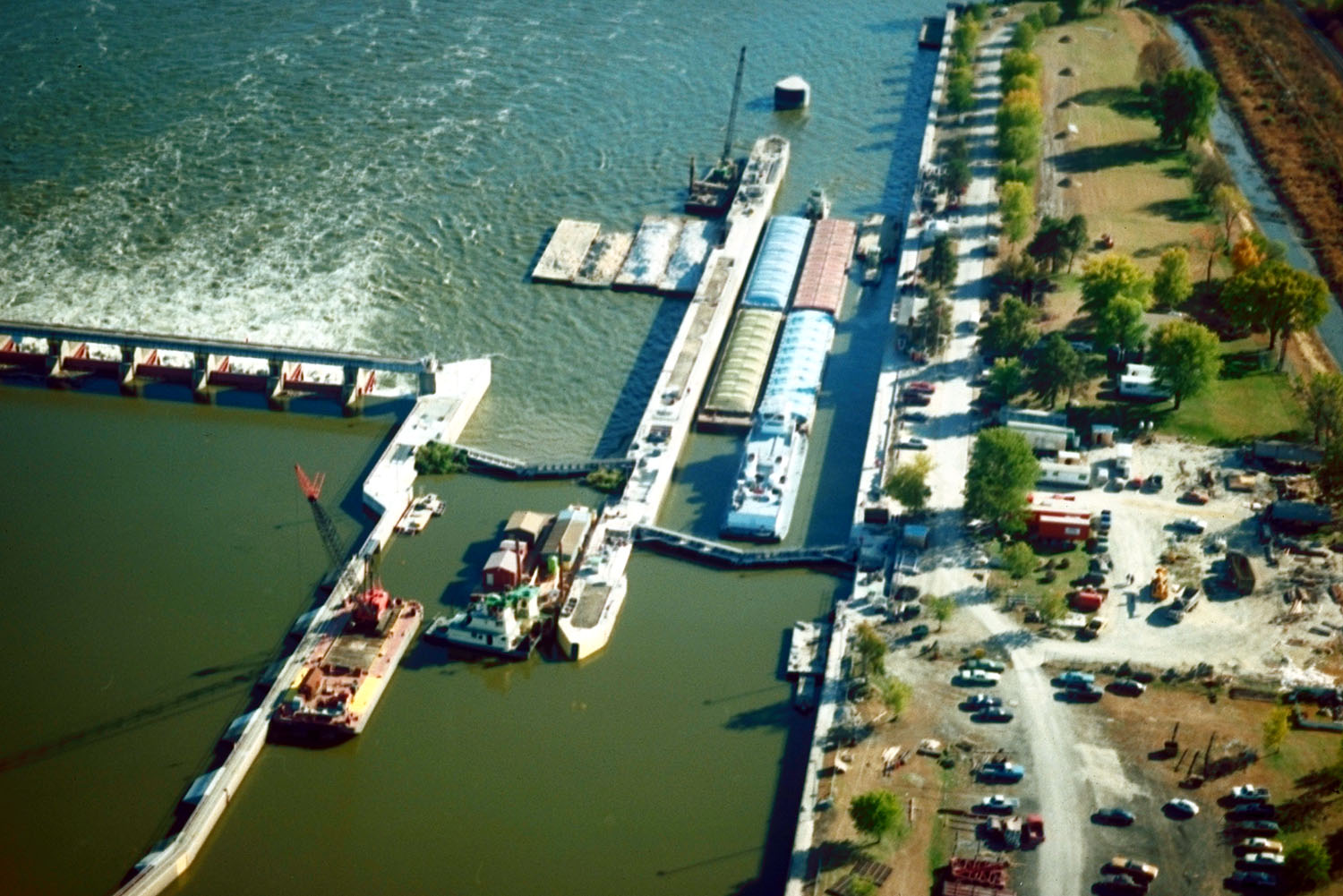
Lock and Dam number 20. View is downriver to the south.

== History ==
The Lock and Dam are on the site of the former town of Tully, Missouri. Tully was founded in 1834 and became a thriving river port and regional business hub until being virtually destroyed by major flooding in 1851. Left a crumbling "ghost town", what little that remained of Tully was finally removed during Lock and Dam No. 20's construction.
