= One Thirty North Eighth Building =

- U.S. National Register of Historic Places
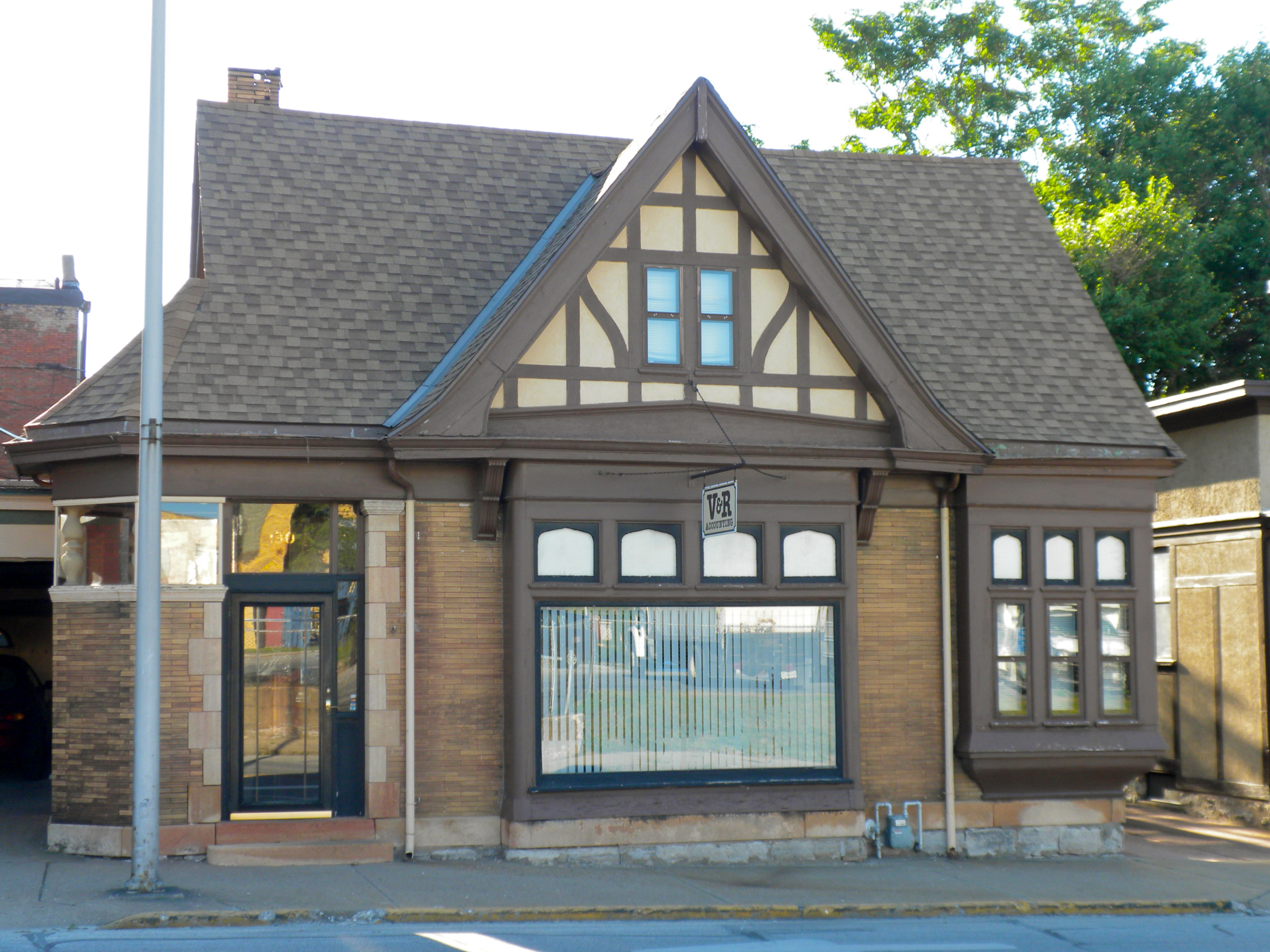

- Location within Illinois Location within the United States
- Interactive map showing the location of One Thirty North Eighth Building
- Location: 130 N. 8th St., Quincy, Illinois
- Coordinates: 39°55′58″N 91°24′10″W
- Area: less than one acre
- Built: 1900
- Architect: Wood, Ernest
- Architectural style: Tudor Revival
- NRHP reference No.: 84000918
- Added to NRHP: February 9, 1984

The One Thirty North Eighth Building is a historic building located at 130 North 8th Street in Quincy, Illinois.

== Description and history ==
The building was built in 1900 as a photography studio. Prominent Quincy architect Ernest M. Wood designed the building in the Tudor Revival style. The building is representative of Wood's early works, before his style became influenced by Frank Lloyd Wright's work; it can be contrasted with Wood's own office, a Prairie School building of similar size which Wood designed twelve years later. Significant Tudor elements of the building include its half-timbered gable on the second floor, steep gable roof, and decorative interior woodwork.

The building was added to the National Register of Historic Places on February 9, 1984.
