= Lewis Round Barn =

- U.S. National Register of Historic Places
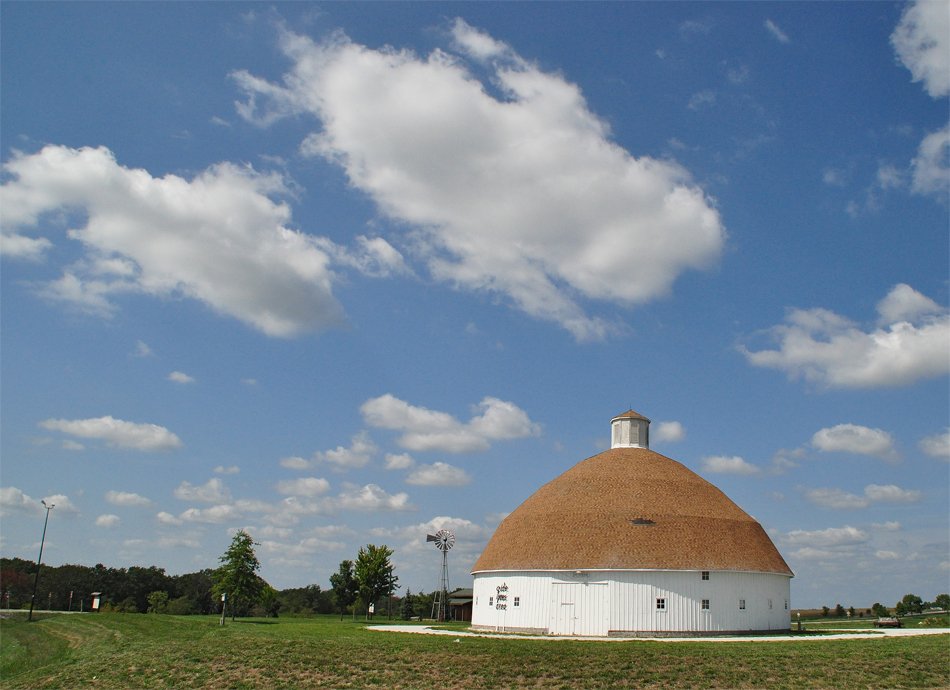

- Location within Illinois Location within the United States
- Location: Adams County, Illinois
- Nearest city: Mendon, Illinois
- Coordinates: 40°03′6.5″N 91°16′20.3″W
- Area: 1 acre (0.40 ha)
- Built: 1914
- Architect: Lambert Huber
- Architectural style: Round barn
- MPS: MPL001 - Round Barns in Illinois Thematic Resources
- NRHP reference No.: 02001750
- Added to NRHP: January 29, 2003

The Lewis Round Barn is located in Mendon, Illinois, in northwestern Adams County. It is one of 14 round barns recognized by the Illinois Historic Preservation Agency. The barn was listed on the National Register of Historic Places on January 29, 2003.

== History ==
=== Construction ===
When Charles E. Lewis decided he needed a large barn for his large herd of cattle and hogs, he thought outside the box, so to speak. Having heard about three round barns built around 1900 for the College of Agriculture at the University of Illinois, he was intrigued. The efficiency of the round barn's structure is what impressed Lewis, but he didn't need the university's barns - he needed a much larger barn. His mind began to build a vision of a barn that was much larger than any round barn built in the Midwest, at the time. He selected 40 acres (16 ha) of timbered land from the 160-acre (65 ha) Grove Place, a recent acquisition of his father's estate. The land was thick with large elm and oak trees, as well as other native Illinois tree species. Lewis built a portable sawmill at the site and hired several men to log the land with cross-cut saws and axes, while also working the logs into lumber and piling them to air dry. This occurred during the fall and continued well into the winter of 1911.

Lambert Huber, a prominent carpenter in the area, was hired as architect, engineer and building foreman. Though he had never built a round barn, he decided to undertake the project. Even with Huber hired, construction on the barn could not commence until 1914, when all the lumber had sufficiently cured.

The project itself was somewhat complicated, even for a round barn. The roof of the barn was to be an entirely self-supporting dome without structural support, to save the outside walls of the building. The four-section rafters of the roof would be reinforced at each of the joints. The project began with the digging of ditches where concrete foundation footings were poured. The footings would support the outer, circular wall. A 24-foot (7.3 m) diameter circle was laid out in order to accommodate the silo and silage feeding bunk around the silo.

A 40-foot (12 m) stave silo was constructed at the site, with an 18-foot (5.5 m) diameter. The silo was constructed out of Douglas fir staves that had been totally cleared of knots. The barn itself had siding of one inch by 12-inch (300 mm) white pine, and long, wooden shingles made from Western red cedar. Of all the wood required to construct the Lewis Round Barn, only the shingles and siding materials had to be purchased; the rest came from the property's woodland that was logged to create the barn site.

Once concrete pillars were poured, foundations of the 6 × 6 posts supporting the circular haymow at the site were created, and the dome-shaped roof could be erected. The rafters were assembled on the mow floor, so the true challenge proved to be hefting them into place. Each of the rafters, 50 feet (15 m) in length, were made of heavy, hardwood lumber. The roof construction required the building of a 46-foot (14 m) scaffold structure from the haymow floor up. A 10-foot (3.0 m) diameter laminated wooden, circular ring was built at a carpentry shop in Camp Point and placed atop the scaffold. These additions dramatically increased efficiency but there were not enough workers to raise the massive beams. The problem of the raising of the rafters would be solved by an old horse.

One of Lewis' favorite horses, "Old Kit", came into play. With a series of ropes and pulleys, a boom pole and the horse the rafters were slowly lifted into place. Each rafter was raised and nailed into place on the barn's top ring. As three or four of the rafters were raised into place it became apparent that a high wind could take the partially completed roof structure down, workers hoped for no high winds. Their hopes were granted and no high winds arose until all of the rafters were raised the roof was complete. To top off the dome a cupola roof was added with a lightning rod. At the very top a weather vane was added with a steer said to be covered in gold leaf.

With the barn complete Huber remarked that he had lost many hours of sleep trying to figure out the many specification of the building as well as its numerous parts. Though he thought the barn a complete success he said he would never build another round barn.

=== 20th-century renovations ===
The barn served Lewis' purpose for many years but time began to take its toll. In the late 50s or early 60s the weight of the cupola caused part of the roof start sagging. The cupola was removed and the hole was shingled over. Eventually the entire roof was reshingled and in the recent past five of the Lewis brothers and a cousin held a working weekend to make repairs. A portion of the barn had to be jacked up and a major foundation buttress had to be replaced with new concrete. Window openings were covered with plexiglas and a cable was installed around the outside of the barn to prevent further spreading of the building. It was then that the Lewis family decided if the barn was to survive the 21st century it would need continued care and maintenance. The family donated the barn to the Adams County Olde Tyme Association. The association proposed a bold move for the historic site.

=== Moving the barn ===
The barn could be moved, the association proposed, moved 25 miles (40 km) away, to a site near the Adams County Fair Grounds. The barn's importance was demonstrated when the Illinois Historic Preservation Agency awarded a $150,000 grant to assist in the moving and restoration of the Lewis Round Barn. The project faced much criticism, many thinking the Olde Tyme Association had lost its marbles if it believed the nearly 100 year structure could be successfully moved. Regardless, the project steamed forward. The plans got off the drawing board in early 2000 when a contract was awarded to a group of Amish carpenters and work began.

Two sets of old shingles were peeled from the roof. Chain saws hacked the roof into numerous pie-shaped pieces. The haymow and the outside walls were dismantled and moved to the new site. The barn was gone, only the silo remained standing, a solitary testament to history. The Association contracted a crane to pick up the entire silo and lay it down on a flat bed truck trailer. Then a heavy duty farm tractor came in to pull the silo down the hill. As the tractor started up the hill the silo looked as if it were going to collapse inwardly so the tractor was stopped and the silo chained off to a tree overnight until the Amish carpenters could reinforce the silo's bracing. The next day the silo was slowly pulled over gravel country roads, the State of Illinois would not permit the silo to travel over concrete State Highways, to its new site.

At the new site the walls were re-erected. High winds threatened to derail the entire project when the walls were blown down before they could be stabilized, oddly echoing the very concerns that the workers on the original construction of the barn had voiced nearly a century earlier. When the walls came down they took part of the first rafters with them and the project looked doomed. It was not, however, and the walls were re-erected, the project went forward. When the roof was finished off a replica cupola was installed on the top and the project was a total success.
