= Ursa Town Hall =

- U.S. National Register of Historic Places
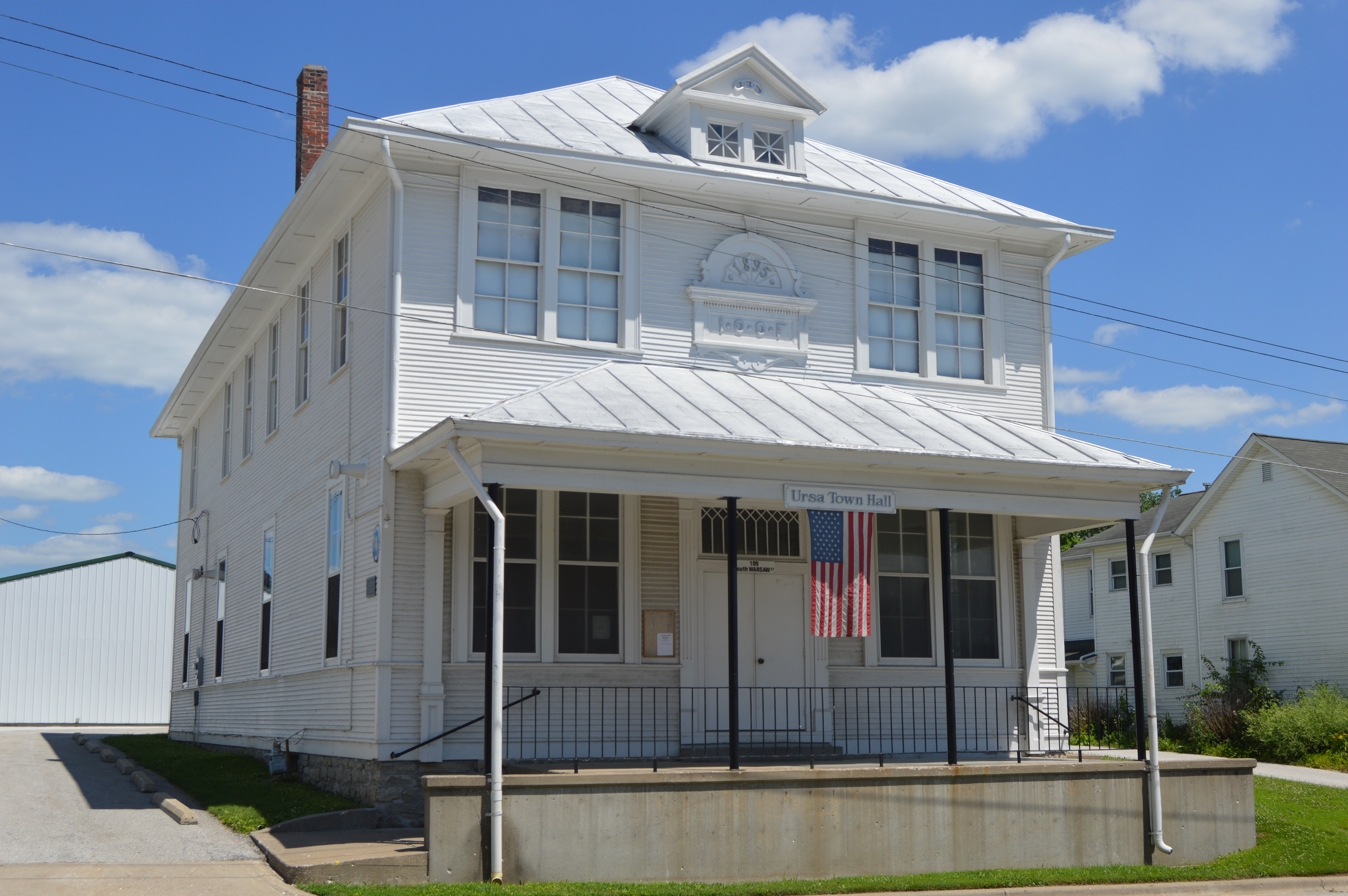

- Location within Illinois Location within the United States
- Location: 109 S. Warsaw St., Ursa, Illinois
- Coordinates: 40°4′25″N 91°22′00″W
- Area: less than one acre
- Built: 1895
- Architectural style: Colonial Revival
- NRHP reference No.: 02000095
- Added to NRHP: March 1, 2002

The Ursa Town Hall, also known as the Ursa Odd Fellows Lodge, is a historic building located at 109 South Warsaw Street in Ursa, Illinois. The building was constructed in 1895; from its completion, it was intended to serve both as Ursa's town hall and as a meeting place for the local lodges of the Independent Order of Odd Fellows and the Freemasons. The Odd Fellows funded the building and owned the hall, lending space to the other groups; however, Ursa Township eventually purchased the first floor of the building, as the Odd Fellows only met on the upper floor per the order's custom. The town used the lower floor for its meetings and as a polling place; the meeting space has also held school events, as the local school lacked an auditorium, and business meetings. The hall also served as the community's social center; the Odd Fellows hosted many community events, and residents watched traveling performers and movies in the hall.

After Ursa was incorporated as a village in 1964, village government also began to use the building. After the village installed a new sewer system in 1984, it outlawed the use of outdoor toilets; the township, whose officials opposed the law, demolished the hall's outhouses but did not add indoor facilities. Due to the building's newfound lack of toilets, its use in the community dropped dramatically.

The building was added to the National Register of Historic Places on March 1, 2002.
