= F. D. Thomas House =

Historic house in Illinois, United States

- U.S. National Register of Historic Places
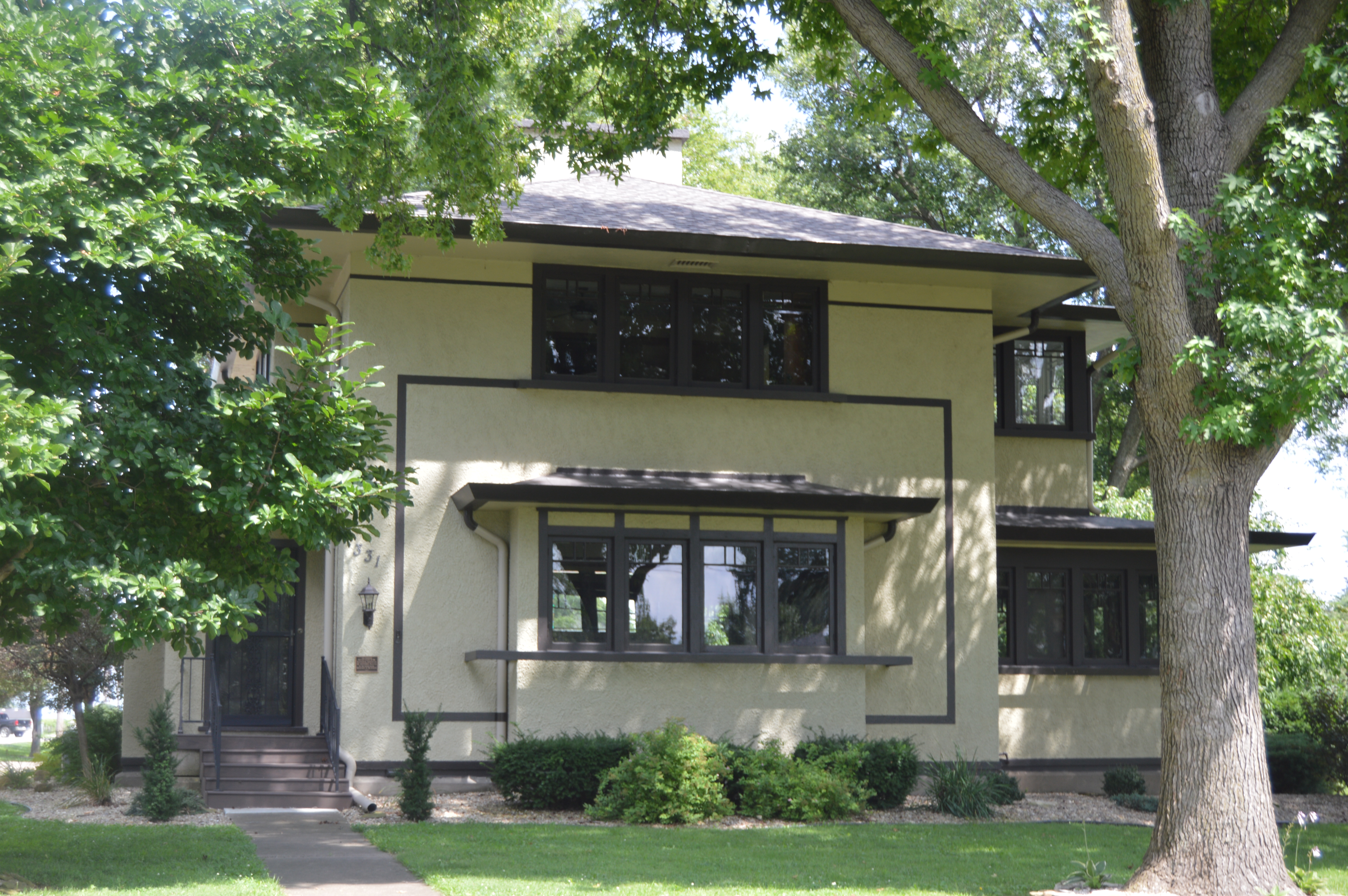
- Front of the house

- Location within Illinois Location within the United States
- Location: 331 N. Ohio St., Camp Point, Illinois
- Coordinates: 40°2′50.5″N 91°3′51″W
- Area: less than one acre
- Built: 1917
- Architect: Ernest Wood
- Architectural style: Prairie School
- NRHP reference No.: 83000299
- Added to NRHP: July 28, 1983

The F. D. Thomas House is a historic house located at 321 North Ohio Street in Camp Point, Adams County, Illinois. The house was built in 1917 for F. D. Thomas, a successful local banker. Architect Ernest M. Wood, a prominent architect in the Quincy area, designed the Prairie School house. Wood was influenced by the work of Frank Lloyd Wright, and he was primarily responsible for bringing the Prairie School to western Illinois. The house's key Prairie School features include a stucco exterior with wooden trim, casement windows, a low hip roof, and an open interior layout.

The house was listed on the National Register of Historic Places on July 28, 1983.
