= State Savings Loan and Trust =

- U.S. National Register of Historic Places
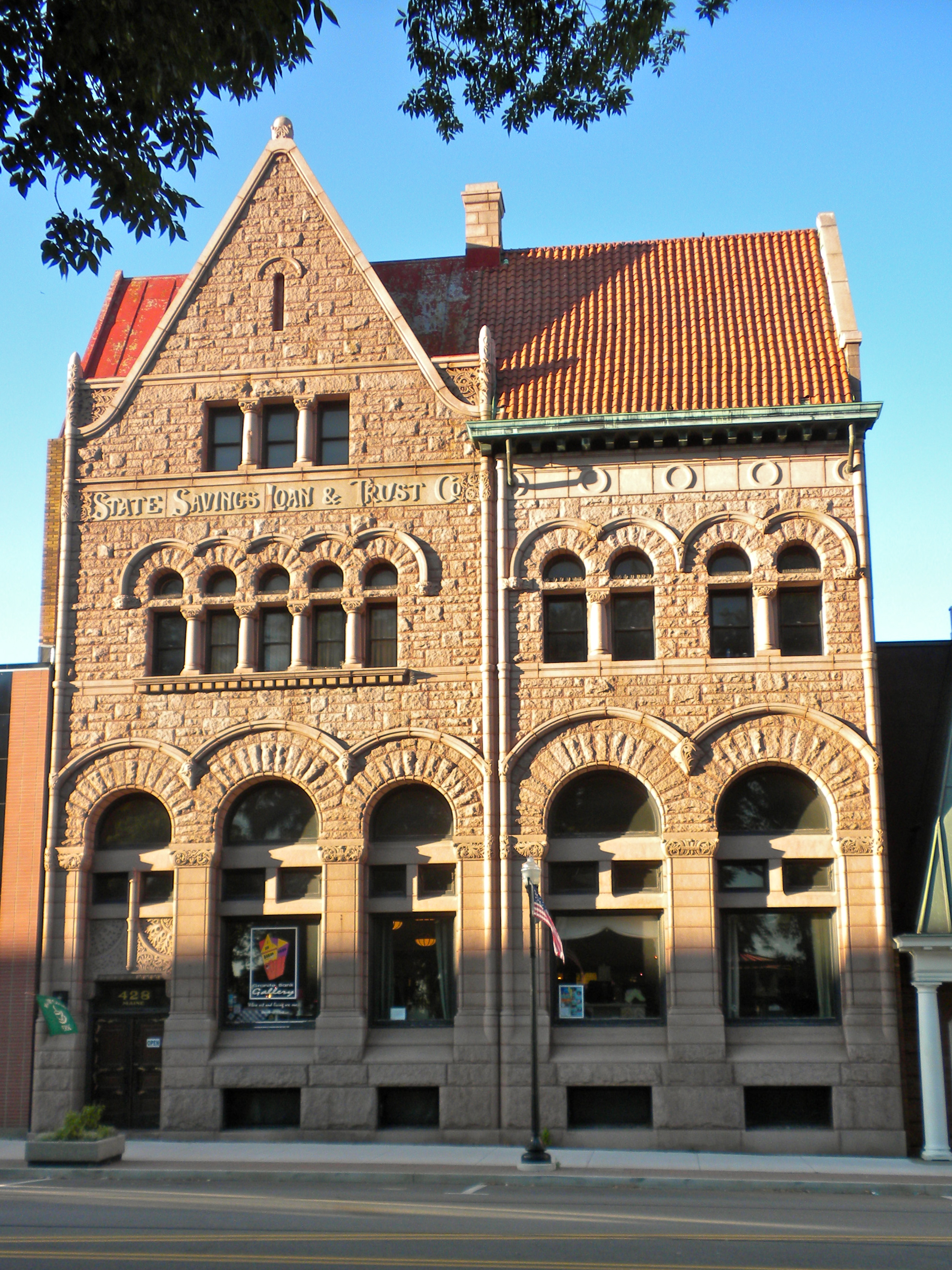

- Location within Illinois Location within the United States
- Location: 428 Maine St., Quincy, Illinois
- Coordinates: 39°55′55″N 91°24′32″W
- Area: less than one acre
- Built: 1892
- Architect: Patton & Fisher; Wood, Ernest M.
- Architectural style: Richardsonian Romanesque
- NRHP reference No.: 79000813
- Added to NRHP: March 23, 1979

State Savings Loan and Trust is a historic bank building located at 428 Maine Street in Quincy, Illinois. The bank was built in 1892 for brothers Lorenzo and Charles H. Bull, who were prominent Quincy businessmen and community leaders. Chicago architectural firm Patton & Fisher designed the bank in the Richardsonian Romanesque style; local architect Ernest M. Wood designed an addition for the building in 1906. The building has a five-bay facade, with three bays on the original portion and two on the addition; the bays are each marked by a window with a thick stone arch. The original section is topped by a large front-facing gable, providing for attic space above the second story.

The building was added to the National Register of Historic Places on March 23, 1979.
