= S.J. Lesem Building =

- U.S. National Register of Historic Places
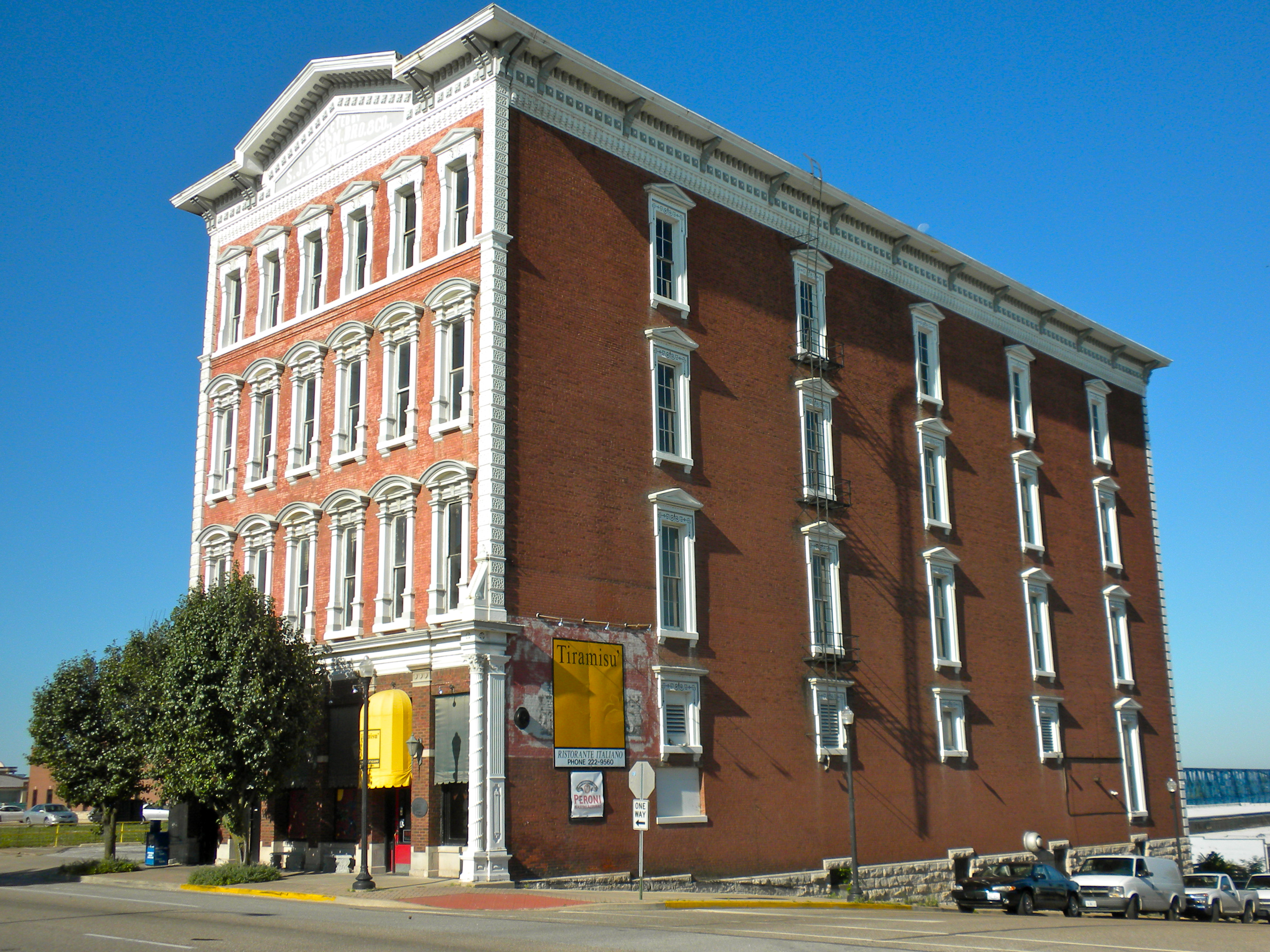

- Location within Illinois Location within the United States
- Interactive map showing the location of S.J. Lesem Building
- Location: 135-37 N 3rd St., Quincy, Illinois
- Coordinates: 39°56′6″N 91°24′43″W
- Area: less than one acre
- Built: 1871
- Architectural style: Italianate
- NRHP reference No.: 99001377
- Added to NRHP: November 22, 1999

The S.J. Lesem Building is a historic commercial building located at 135-37 North 3rd Street in Quincy, Illinois. The building was constructed in 1871 for S.J. Lesem Brothers and Company, a dry goods firm founded in 1859; it is the only survivor of the four commercial buildings which once occupied the block, which was known as Wholesale Row. After the dry goods company changed ownership and moved elsewhere, the Quincy Casket Company occupied the building from 1912 to 1977. The four-story building has a commercial Italianate design. The building's windows are tall and narrow with arched or pedimented hoods, and its storefront features brick pilasters and cast iron columns. Cast iron quoins adorn the corners of the building. The top of the building features a bracketed cornice and a pediment on the front facade.

The building was added to the National Register of Historic Places on November 22, 1999.
