= Northeast Township, Illinois =

Township in Illinois, US

Northeast Township
- Township
- Location in Adams County

- Adams County's location in Illinois
- Coordinates: 40°08′39″N 90°58′24″W
- Country: United States
- State: Illinois
- County: Adams
- Established: November 6, 1849

Area
  - Total: 37.15 sq mi (96.2 km^{2})
  - Land: 37.14 sq mi (96.2 km^{2})
  - Water: 0.02 sq mi (0.052 km^{2}) 0.05%
- Elevation: 699 ft (213 m)

Population (2020)
  - Total: 836
  - Density: 22.5/sq mi (8.69/km^{2})
- Time zone: UTC-6 (CST)
  - Summer (DST): UTC-5 (CDT)
- ZIP codes: 62311, 62324, 62339, 62346
- FIPS code: 17-001-53624

Northeast Township is one of twenty-two townships in Adams County, Illinois, United States. As of the 2010 census, its population was 840 and it contained 398 housing units.

== Geography ==
According to the 2010 census, the township has a total area of 37.15 square miles (96.2 km^{2}), of which 37.14 square miles (96.2 km^{2}) (or 99.97%) is land and 0.02 square miles (0.052 km^{2}) (or 0.05%) is water.

=== Cities ===
- Golden (vast majority)
- La Prairie

=== Cemeteries ===
The township contains four cemeteries: Leenerts, Memorial Gardens, Mount Horeb and Walker.

=== Airports and landing strips ===
- Robbins Landing Strip

== Demographics ==
As of the 2020 census there were 836 people, 426 households, and 254 families residing in the township. The population density was 22.49 inhabitants per square mile (8.68/km^{2}). There were 383 housing units at an average density of 10.31 per square mile (3.98/km^{2}). The racial makeup of the township was 94.62% White, 0.12% African American, 0.24% Native American, 0.84% Asian, 0.00% Pacific Islander, 0.36% from other races, and 3.83% from two or more races. Hispanic or Latino of any race were 1.67% of the population.

There were 426 households, out of which 31.90% had children under the age of 18 living with them, 46.24% were married couples living together, 12.21% had a female householder with no spouse present, and 40.38% were non-families. 38.00% of all households were made up of individuals, and 26.80% had someone living alone who was 65 years of age or older. The average household size was 2.09 and the average family size was 2.72.

The township's age distribution consisted of 21.0% under the age of 18, 4.8% from 18 to 24, 20.9% from 25 to 44, 22.6% from 45 to 64, and 30.8% who were 65 years of age or older. The median age was 47.5 years. For every 100 females, there were 109.7 males. For every 100 females age 18 and over, there were 90.9 males.

The median income for a household in the township was $56,563, and the median income for a family was $76,667. Males had a median income of $40,000 versus $30,658 for females. The per capita income for the township was $29,932. About 8.3% of families and 12.4% of the population were below the poverty line, including 11.7% of those under age 18 and 19.7% of those age 65 or over.

Historical population
Census	Pop.	Note	%±
2010	840		—
2020	836		−0.5%
U.S. Decennial Census

== School districts ==
- Central Community Unit School District 3
- Southeastern Community Unit School District 337

== Political districts ==
- Illinois' 18th congressional district
- State House District 93
- State Senate District 47
