= Camp Point Township, Illinois =

Township in Illinois, US

Camp Point Township
- Township
- Location in Adams County

- Adams County's location in Illinois
- Coordinates: 40°04′13″N 91°05′16″W
- Country: United States
- State: Illinois
- County: Adams

Area
  - Total: 37.68 sq mi (97.6 km^{2})
  - Land: 37.61 sq mi (97.4 km^{2})
  - Water: 0.07 sq mi (0.18 km^{2}) 0.19%
- Elevation: 702 ft (214 m)

Population (2020)
  - Total: 1,654
  - Density: 43.98/sq mi (16.98/km^{2})
- Time zone: UTC-6 (CST)
  - Summer (DST): UTC-5 (CDT)
- ZIP codes: 62320, 62325, 62339, 62351
- FIPS code: 17-001-10890

Camp Point Township is one of twenty-two townships in Adams County, Illinois, United States. As of the 2020 census, its population was 1,654 and it contained 679 housing units.

== History ==
Camp Point was organized as a political township in 1849. The township took its name from a former Indian camping site within its borders.

== Geography ==
According to the 2010 census, the township has a total area of 37.68 square miles (97.6 km^{2}), of which 37.61 square miles (97.4 km^{2}) (or 99.81%) is land and 0.07 square miles (0.18 km^{2}) (or 0.19%) is water.

=== Cities, villages and towns ===
- Camp Point

=== Cemeteries ===
The township contains three cemeteries: Evergreen, Hebron and Wallace.

=== Major highways ===
- US Route 24
- Illinois State Route 94

=== Airports and landing strips ===
- Searls Field
- Searls RLA 59 Airport

=== Landmarks ===
- Bailey Park

== Demographics ==
As of the 2020 census there were 1,654 people, 588 households, and 379 families residing in the township. The population density was 43.95 inhabitants per square mile (16.97/km^{2}). There were 679 housing units at an average density of 18.04 units per square mile (6.97 units/km^{2}). The racial makeup of the township was 94.86% White, 0.24% African American, 0.12% Native American, 0.48% Asian, 0.00% Pacific Islander, 0.48% from other races, and 3.81% from two or more races. Hispanic or Latino of any race were 1.21% of the population.

There were 588 households, out of which 37.40% had children under the age of 18 living with them, 49.32% were married couples living together, 6.46% had a female householder with no spouse present, and 35.54% were non-families. 28.10% of all households were made up of individuals, and 13.10% had someone living alone who was 65 years of age or older. The average household size was 2.63 and the average family size was 3.29.

The township's age distribution consisted of 30.6% under the age of 18, 6.3% from 18 to 24, 21.3% from 25 to 44, 24.9% from 45 to 64, and 17.0% who were 65 years of age or older. The median age was 37.5 years. For every 100 females, there were 104.4 males. For every 100 females age 18 and over, there were 94.8 males.

The median income for a household in the township was $56,121, and the median income for a family was $70,139. Males had a median income of $41,842 versus $30,486 for females. The per capita income for the township was $24,096. About 2.6% of families and 5.7% of the population were below the poverty line, including 7.2% of those under age 18 and 9.6% of those age 65 or over.

Historical population
Census	Pop.	Note	%±
2010	1,632		—
2020	1,654		1.3%
U.S. Decennial Census

== School districts ==
- Central Community Unit School District 3

== Political districts ==
- Illinois' 18th congressional district
- State House District 93
- State Senate District 47
