= Lima Township, Illinois =

Township in Illinois, US

Lima Township
- Township
- Location in Adams County

- Adams County's location in Illinois
- Coordinates: 40°10′12″N 91°23′33″W
- Country: United States
- State: Illinois
- County: Adams
- Established: November 6, 1849

Area
  - Total: 57.82 sq mi (149.8 km^{2})
  - Land: 55.15 sq mi (142.8 km^{2})
  - Water: 2.67 sq mi (6.9 km^{2}) 4.62%
- Elevation: 607 ft (185 m)

Population (2020)
  - Total: 514
  - Density: 9.32/sq mi (3.60/km^{2})
- Time zone: UTC-6 (CST)
  - Summer (DST): UTC-5 (CDT)
- ZIP codes: 62348, 62349, 62351, 62373, 62376, 62379
- FIPS code: 17-001-43458

Lima Township is one of 22 townships in Adams County, Illinois, United States. At the 2020 census, its population was 514, and it contained 241 housing units.

== Geography ==
According to the 2010 census, the township has a total area of 57.82 square miles (149.8 km^{2}), of which 55.15 square miles (142.8 km^{2}) (or 95.38%) is land and 2.67 square miles (6.9 km^{2}) (or 4.62%) is water.

=== Cities ===
- Lima

=== Unincorporated towns ===
- Meyer

=== Cemeteries ===
The township contains four cemeteries: Gallimore, Higgins, Karnes and Lima.

=== Major highways ===
- Illinois State Route 96

=== Airports and landing strips ===
- Hagemeister Landing Strip
- McAllister Landing Strip
- The Adwell Corporation Airport

=== Lakes ===
- Martin Lake

=== Landmarks ===
- Cp Saukenauk
- Lock and Dam No. 20

== Demographics ==
As of the 2020 census there were 514 people, 181 households, and 152 families residing in the township. The population density was 8.89 inhabitants per square mile (3.43/km^{2}). There were 241 housing units at an average density of 4.17 units per square mile (1.61 units/km^{2}). The racial makeup of the township was 94.55% White, 0.00% African American, 0.19% Native American, 0.00% Asian, 0.00% Pacific Islander, 1.56% from other races, and 3.70% from two or more races. Hispanic or Latino of any race were 2.33% of the population.

There were 181 households, out of which 34.30% had children under the age of 18 living with them, 76.24% were married couples living together, 6.63% had a female householder with no spouse present, and 16.02% were non-families. 14.90% of all households were made up of individuals, and 8.30% had someone living alone who was 65 years of age or older. The average household size was 2.76 and the average family size was 2.93.

The township's age distribution consisted of 25.1% under the age of 18, 8.0% from 18 to 24, 26% from 25 to 44, 32.2% from 45 to 64, and 8.6% who were 65 years of age or older. The median age was 37.3 years. For every 100 females, there were 69.7 males. For every 100 females age 18 and over, there were 96.8 males.

The median income for a household in the township was $76,172, and the median income for a family was $79,643. Males had a median income of $46,016 versus $24,583 for females. The per capita income for the township was $28,039. About 5.9% of families and 6.2% of the population were below the poverty line, including 8.1% of those under age 18 and none of those age 65 or over.

Historical population
Census	Pop.	Note	%±
2010	534		—
2020	514		−3.7%
U.S. Decennial Census

== School districts ==
- Griggsville-Perry Community Unit School District 4

== Political districts ==
- Illinois' 17th congressional district
- State House District 93
- State Senate District 47
