= Houston Township, Illinois =

Township in Illinois, US

Houston Township
- Township
- Location in Adams County

- Adams County's location in Illinois
- Coordinates: 40°08′36″N 91°05′24″W
- Country: United States
- State: Illinois
- County: Adams
- Established: November 6, 1849

Area
  - Total: 37.94 sq mi (98.3 km^{2})
  - Land: 37.92 sq mi (98.2 km^{2})
  - Water: 0.02 sq mi (0.052 km^{2}) 0.05%
- Elevation: 692 ft (211 m)

Population (2020)
  - Total: 186
  - Density: 4.91/sq mi (1.89/km^{2})
- Time zone: UTC-6 (CST)
  - Summer (DST): UTC-5 (CDT)
- ZIP codes: 62316, 62320, 62339, 62346, 62349
- FIPS code: 17-001-36295
- GNIS feature ID: 429151

Houston Township is one of twenty-two townships in Adams County, Illinois, United States. As of the 2020 census, its population was 186 and it contained 97 housing units.

== Geography ==
According to the 2021 census gazetteer files, Houston Township has a total area of 37.93 square miles (98.24 km^{2}), of which 37.92 square miles (98.21 km^{2}) (or 99.96%) is land and 0.02 square miles (0.05 km^{2}) (or 0.04%) is water.

=== Cities ===
- Golden (west edge)

=== Post offices ===
- Chatton

=== Cemeteries ===
The township contains three cemeteries: Ebenezer, Lutheran Friedhof and York Neck.

=== Major highways ===
- Illinois State Route 61
- Illinois State Route 94

== Demographics ==
As of the 2020 census there were 186 people, 95 households, and 48 families residing in the township. The population density was 4.90 inhabitants per square mile (1.89/km^{2}). There were 97 housing units at an average density of 2.56 units per square mile (0.99 units/km^{2}). The racial makeup of the township was 95.70% White, 0.00% African American, 0.54% Native American, 0.00% Asian, 0.00% Pacific Islander, 0.54% from other races, and 3.23% from two or more races. Hispanic or Latino of any race were 1.61% of the population.

There were 95 households, out of which 23.20% had children under the age of 18 living with them, 50.53% were married couples living together, 0.00% had a female householder with no spouse present, and 49.47% were non-families. 49.50% of all households were made up of individuals, and 41.10% had someone living alone who was 65 years of age or older. The average household size was 1.99 and the average family size was 2.96.

The township's age distribution consisted of 24.9% under the age of 18, none from 18 to 24, 33.3% from 25 to 44, 21.2% from 45 to 64, and 20.6% who were 65 years of age or older. The median age was 42.0 years. For every 100 females, there were 54.9 males. For every 100 females age 18 and over, there were 69.0 males.

The median income for a household in the township was $60,156, and the median income for a family was $106,875. Males had a median income of $51,458 versus $40,083 for females. The per capita income for the township was $30,087. None of the population was below the poverty line.

Historical population
Census	Pop.	Note	%±
2000	161		—
2010	221		37.3%
2020	186		−15.8%
U.S. Decennial Census

== School districts ==
- Central Community Unit School District 3
- Southeastern Community Unit School District 337

== Political districts ==
- Illinois' 18th congressional district
- State House District 93
- State Senate District 47
