= Ursa Township, Illinois =

Township in Illinois, US

Ursa Township
- Township
- Location in Adams County

- Adams County's location in Illinois
- Coordinates: 40°04′55″N 91°24′24″W
- Country: United States
- State: Illinois
- County: Adams
- Established: November 6, 1849

Area
  - Total: 61.03 sq mi (158.1 km^{2})
  - Land: 57.22 sq mi (148.2 km^{2})
  - Water: 3.81 sq mi (9.9 km^{2}) 6.24%
- Elevation: 476 ft (145 m)

Population (2020)
  - Total: 1,102
  - Density: 19.26/sq mi (7.436/km^{2})
- Time zone: UTC-6 (CST)
  - Summer (DST): UTC-5 (CDT)
- ZIP codes: 62301, 62351, 62376, 62379
- FIPS code: 17-001-77057

Ursa Township is one of twenty-two townships in Adams County, Illinois, United States. As of the 2010 census, its population was 1,073 and it contained 507 housing units.

== Geography ==
According to the 2010 census, the township has a total area of 61.03 square miles (158.1 km^{2}), of which 57.22 square miles (148.2 km^{2}) (or 93.76%) is land and 3.81 square miles (9.9 km^{2}) (or 6.24%) is water.

=== Cities ===
- Ursa

=== Unincorporated towns ===
- Marcelline

=== Cemeteries ===
The township contains six cemeteries: Booth, Denson, Keith, New Providence, Stone Family and Wesley Chapel.

=== Major highways ===
- Illinois State Route 61
- Illinois State Route 96

=== Airports and landing strips ===
- Schnelle Airport

=== Lakes ===
- Indian Grave Lake

== Demographics ==
As of the 2020 census there were 1,102 people, 362 households, and 237 families residing in the township. The population density was 18.09 inhabitants per square mile (6.98/km^{2}). There were 504 housing units at an average density of 8.27 per square mile (3.19/km^{2}). The racial makeup of the township was 93.28% White, 0.09% African American, 0.27% Native American, 0.27% Asian, 0.00% Pacific Islander, 1.36% from other races, and 4.72% from two or more races. Hispanic or Latino of any race were 0.91% of the population.

There were 362 households, out of which 19.60% had children under the age of 18 living with them, 59.94% were married couples living together, 5.52% had a female householder with no spouse present, and 34.53% were non-families. 29.30% of all households were made up of individuals, and 11.30% had someone living alone who was 65 years of age or older. The average household size was 2.15 and the average family size was 2.64.

The township's age distribution consisted of 18.8% under the age of 18, 4.6% from 18 to 24, 23.4% from 25 to 44, 32.7% from 45 to 64, and 20.6% who were 65 years of age or older. The median age was 48.1 years. For every 100 females, there were 109.1 males. For every 100 females age 18 and over, there were 103.9 males.

The median income for a household in the township was $55,357, and the median income for a family was $71,094. Males had a median income of $56,250 versus $26,208 for females. The per capita income for the township was $37,278. About 5.5% of families and 5.7% of the population were below the poverty line, including 2.8% of those under age 18 and 8.8% of those age 65 or over.

Historical population
Census	Pop.	Note	%±
2010	1,073		—
2020	1,102		2.7%
U.S. Decennial Census

== School districts ==
- Griggsville-Perry Community Unit School District 4

== Political districts ==
- Illinois' 17th congressional district
- State House District 93
- State Senate District 47
