= Quincy Northwest Historic District =

Historic district in Illinois, United States

- U.S. National Register of Historic Places
- U.S. Historic district
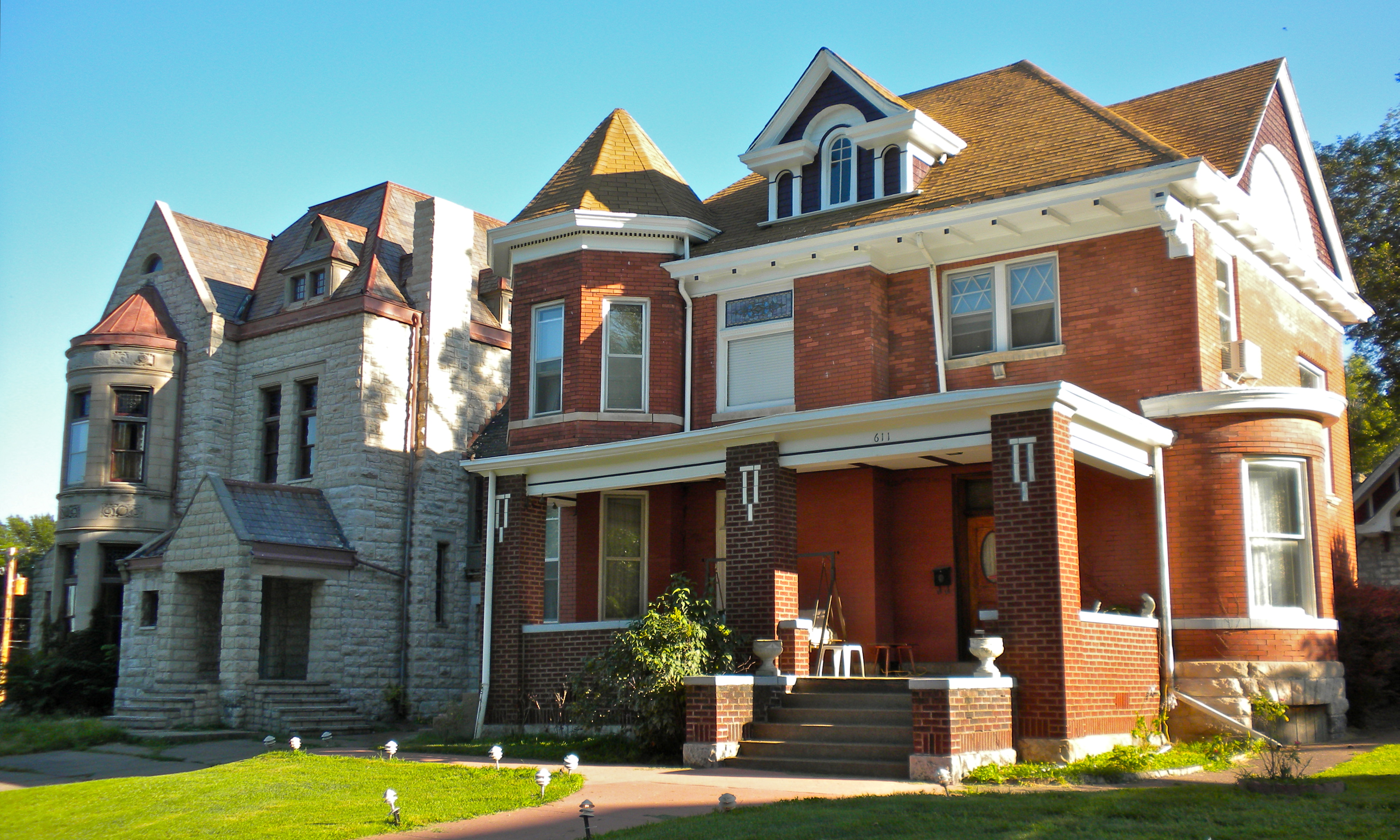

- Location within Illinois Location within the United States
- Location: Roughly bounded by Broadway, N. Second, Locust, and N. Twelfth Sts., Quincy, Illinois
- Coordinates: 39°56′43″N 91°24′18″W
- Area: 488 acres (197 ha)
- NRHP reference No.: 00000414
- Added to NRHP: May 11, 2000

The Quincy Northwest Historic District is a primarily residential historic district in Quincy, Illinois, USA. Located north and west of the city's downtown, the district encompasses over 1,600 contributing buildings; these buildings represent almost every prominent architectural style used between 1840 and 1950. The district developed somewhat irregularly, with no consistent plan or progression; however, development roughly spreads away from downtown and the Mississippi River. While most buildings in the districts are homes, businesses and industrial buildings are interspersed in residential areas without forming clear areas of non-residential use. The Italianate and Queen Anne styles are the two most prevalent of the many formal architectural styles which can be seen in the district; common vernacular styles include the gable front house, the shotgun house, the I-house and the bungalow.

The district was added to the National Register of Historic Places on May 11, 2000.
