= Richard F. Newcomb House =

Historic house in Illinois, United States

- U.S. National Register of Historic Places
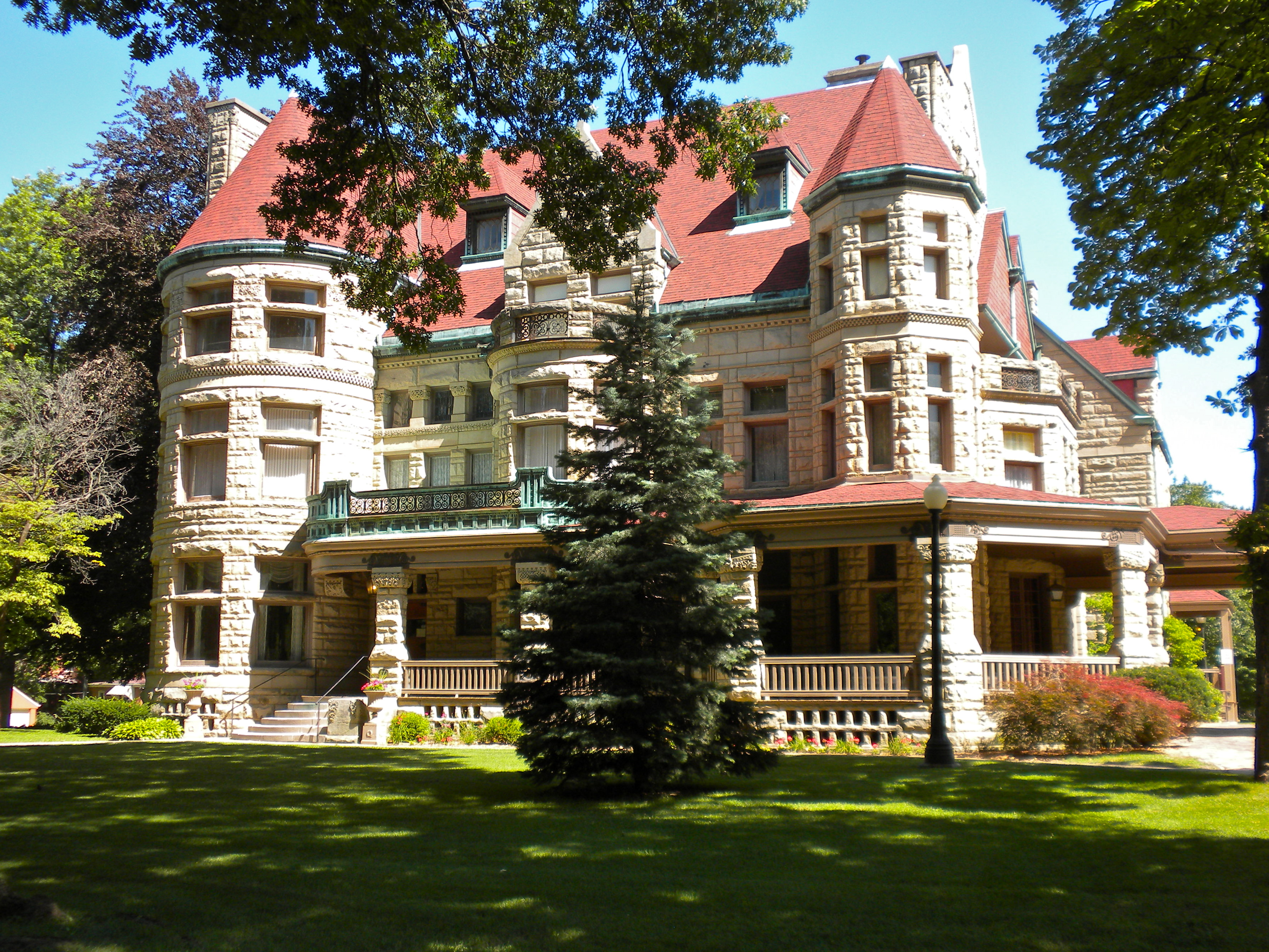

- Location within Illinois Location within the United States
- Interactive map showing the location of Richard F. Newcomb House
- Location: 1601 Maine St., Quincy, Illinois
- Coordinates: 39°55′56″N 91°23′24″W
- Area: 2.5 acres (1.0 ha)
- Built: 1890-91
- Architect: Chatten, Harvey; Wood, Ernest M.
- Architectural style: Romanesque
- NRHP reference No.: 82002516
- Added to NRHP: June 3, 1982

The Richard F. Newcomb House is a historic house located at 1601 Maine Street in Quincy, Illinois. The house was built in 1890-91 for Richard F. Newcomb, the founder of the Quincy Paper Company; the company eventually became a national strawboard-producing firm. Local architects Harvey Chatten and Ernest M. Wood collaborated on the house's Richardsonian Romanesque design; the style choice was inspired by the recently built William S. Warfield House, which Newcomb admired and wished to outdo. The three-story house has a massive limestone exterior with a red shingled roof. The house's wraparound front porch is supported by limestone pillars; smaller porches are located throughout the design. A large conical tower and a smaller octagonal tower rise from the southwest and southeast corners of the house respectively.

John A. Stillwell, Newcomb's son-in-law and president of the Electric Wheel Company, bought the house from Newcomb in 1910. The Stillwell family donated the house to Quincy College in 1941; the college used the house as a women's dormitory.

The house is now home to the Quincy Museum. The first floor has been restored, the second and third floors feature exhibits on local history, natural history, dinosaurs and area Native Americans.

The house was added to the National Register of Historic Places on June 3, 1982.
