= Exchange Bank (Golden, Illinois) =

- U.S. National Register of Historic Places
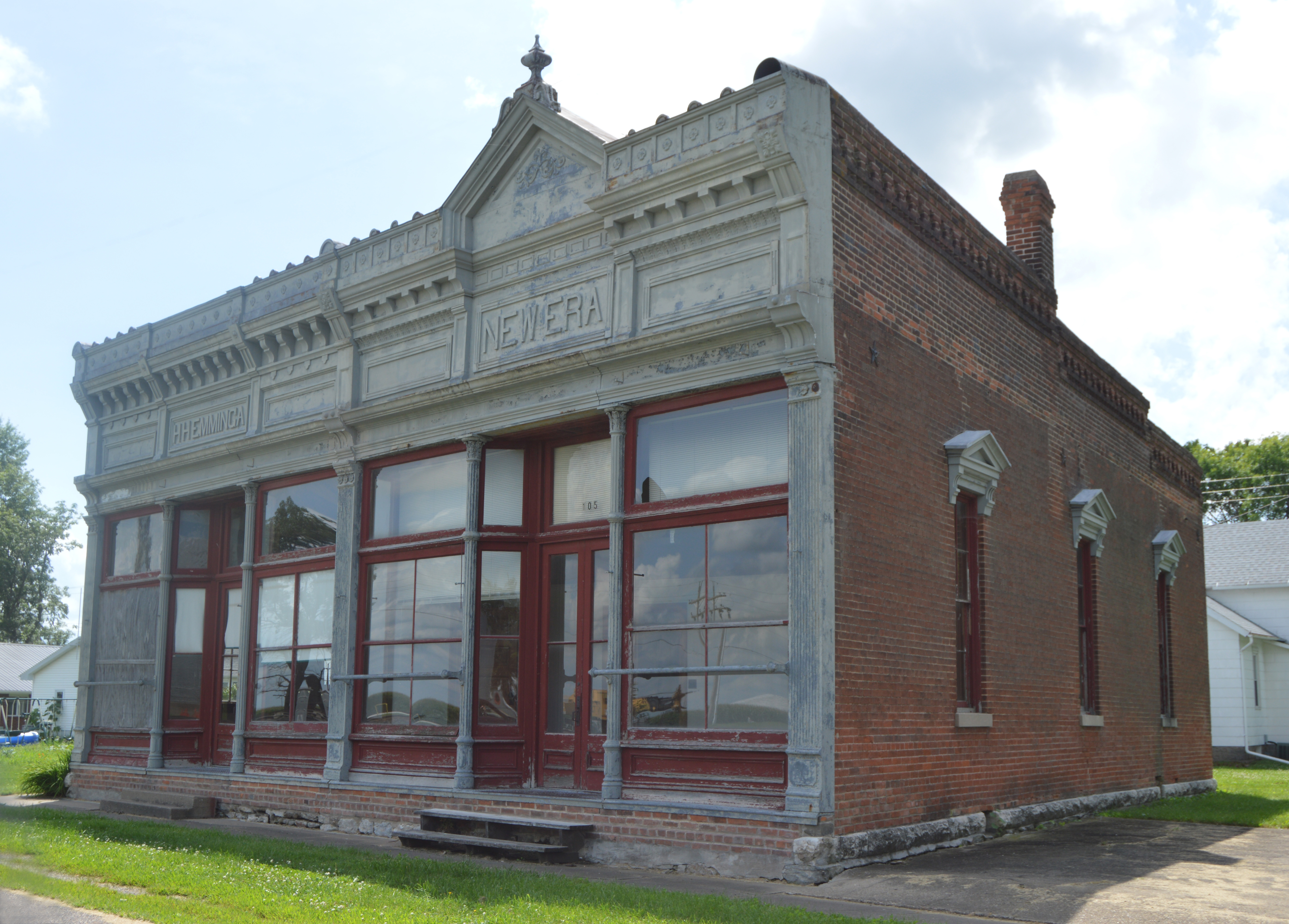
- Front of the bank

- Location within Illinois Location within the United States
- Location: Quincy St., Golden, Illinois
- Coordinates: 40°6′26″N 91°1′1″W
- Area: less than one acre
- Built: 1891
- Architect: Gronewald, William T.
- Architectural style: Italian Renaissance
- NRHP reference No.: 86003714
- Added to NRHP: February 12, 1987

The Exchange Bank is a historic bank building located in Golden, Adams County, Illinois, United States. The Italian Renaissance style bank was built in 1891 for Harm Emminga. Harm was the son of Henrich Emminga, a German immigrant who had started a prosperous milling business in Golden; Harm continued his father's business by building both a new grain elevator and the new bank. The bank was originally an office building for the mill, as its offices had historically loaned and held money for clients, but it soon developed into the town's main bank. The building also housed the town's newspaper, the New Era. In 1905, the bank moved to a new building in downtown Golden, and by the 1920s it had become a prosperous business affiliated with larger regional banks in Quincy; however, it closed in 1930, a victim of the Wall Street crash of 1929.

The bank was added to the National Register of Historic Places on February 12, 1987. It is one of two sites on the National Register in Golden, along with the Ebenezer Methodist Episcopal Chapel and Cemetery.
