= Golden, Illinois =

- Village
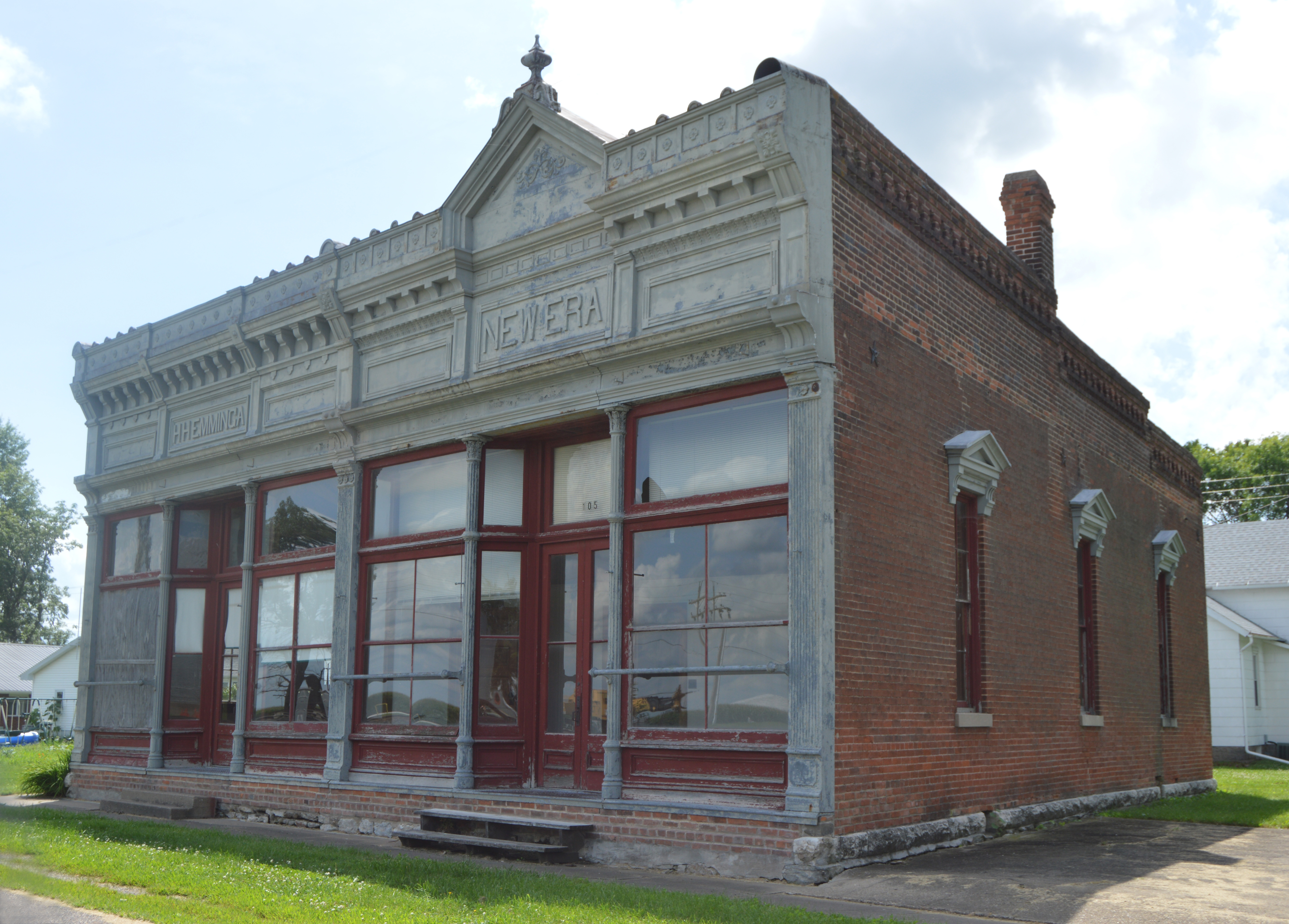
- Exchange Bank on Quincy Street

- Seal
- Motto: The Windmill Town Where the Railroads Cross
- Location in Adams County and the state of Illinois.
- Coordinates: 40°06′37″N 91°01′09″W
- Country: US
- State: Illinois
- County: Adams
- Townships: Northeast, Clayton, Houston
- Established: 1866
- Incorporated: March 5, 1867

Area
  - Total: 0.64 sq mi (1.66 km^{2})
  - Land: 0.64 sq mi (1.66 km^{2})
  - Water: 0 sq mi (0.00 km^{2})
- Elevation: 715 ft (218 m)

Population (2020)
  - Total: 648
  - Estimate (2024): 627 ▼
  - Density: 1,010/sq mi (390/km^{2})
- Time zone: UTC-6 (CST)
  - Summer (DST): UTC-5 (CDT)
- ZIP code: 62339
- Area code: 217
- FIPS code: 17-30159
- GNIS feature ID: 2398172

Golden is a village in Adams County, Illinois, United States. The population was 648 at the 2020 census. It is part of the Quincy, IL–MO Micropolitan Statistical Area.

== History ==
Golden was laid out and platted in 1866 under the name of Keokuk Junction. The village was incorporated on March 5, 1867; the first election was held April 1 of the same year. The village was renamed Golden in 1881, likely due to the presence of a local hotel called the Hotel Golden.

== Geography ==
According to the 2021 census gazetteer files, Golden has a total area of 0.64 square miles (1.66 km^{2}), all land.

=== Climate ===
Climate data for Golden, Illinois (1991–2020)
| Month | Jan | Feb | Mar | Apr | May | Jun | Jul | Aug | Sep | Oct | Nov | Dec | Year |
|---|---|---|---|---|---|---|---|---|---|---|---|---|---|
| Mean daily maximum °F (°C) | 33.8 (1.0) | 38.8 (3.8) | 51.1 (10.6) | 63.5 (17.5) | 74.0 (23.3) | 83.1 (28.4) | 86.5 (30.3) | 84.7 (29.3) | 78.7 (25.9) | 66.1 (18.9) | 51.3 (10.7) | 38.7 (3.7) | 62.5 (17.0) |
| Daily mean °F (°C) | 25.0 (−3.9) | 29.2 (−1.6) | 40.4 (4.7) | 51.6 (10.9) | 63.1 (17.3) | 72.6 (22.6) | 75.6 (24.2) | 73.7 (23.2) | 66.5 (19.2) | 54.4 (12.4) | 41.4 (5.2) | 30.3 (−0.9) | 52.0 (11.1) |
| Mean daily minimum °F (°C) | 16.2 (−8.8) | 19.7 (−6.8) | 29.7 (−1.3) | 39.7 (4.3) | 52.1 (11.2) | 62.2 (16.8) | 64.7 (18.2) | 62.7 (17.1) | 54.2 (12.3) | 42.7 (5.9) | 31.6 (−0.2) | 22.0 (−5.6) | 41.5 (5.3) |
Source: NOAA

=== Registered Historic Places ===
- Ebenezer Methodist Episcopal Chapel and Cemetery
- Exchange Bank

=== Points of interest ===
- The Windmills of Golden

== Demographics ==
Historical population
| Census | Pop. | Note | %± |
|---|---|---|---|
| 1880 | 317 | | — |
| 1890 | 466 | | 47.0% |
| 1900 | 516 | | 10.7% |
| 1910 | 579 | | 12.2% |
| 1920 | 654 | | 13.0% |
| 1930 | 567 | | −13.3% |
| 1940 | 624 | | 10.1% |
| 1950 | 512 | | −17.9% |
| 1960 | 491 | | −4.1% |
| 1970 | 571 | | 16.3% |
| 1980 | 558 | | −2.3% |
| 1990 | 565 | | 1.3% |
| 2000 | 629 | | 11.3% |
| 2010 | 644 | | 2.4% |
| 2020 | 648 | | 0.6% |
U.S. Decennial Census

As of the 2020 census there were 648 people, 297 households, and 180 families residing in the village. The population density was 1,009.35 inhabitants per square mile (389.71/km^{2}). There were 274 housing units at an average density of 426.79 per square mile (164.78/km^{2}). The racial makeup of the village was 93.83% White, 0.31% Native American, 1.23% Asian, 0.46% from other races, and 4.17% from two or more races. Hispanic or Latino of any race were 1.70% of the population.

There were 297 households, out of which 32.7% had children under the age of 18 living with them, 48.15% were married couples living together, 11.11% had a female householder with no husband present, and 39.39% were non-families. 37.71% of all households were made up of individuals, and 21.89% had someone living alone who was 65 years of age or older. The average household size was 2.82 and the average family size was 2.18.

The village's age distribution consisted of 23.4% under the age of 18, 3.5% from 18 to 24, 20.9% from 25 to 44, 25.4% from 45 to 64, and 26.9% who were 65 years of age or older. The median age was 46.8 years. For every 100 females, there were 101.5 males. For every 100 females age 18 and over, there were 82.1 males.

The median income for a household in the village was $51,979, and the median income for a family was $77,857. Males had a median income of $42,054 versus $29,091 for females. The per capita income for the village was $26,132. About 6.7% of families and 14.1% of the population were below the poverty line, including 9.3% of those under age 18 and 32.4% of those age 65 or over.

== Notable people ==
- Tesha Buss, Vermont state legislator
