= Quincy East End Historic District =

Historic district in Illinois, United States

- U.S. National Register of Historic Places
- U.S. Historic district
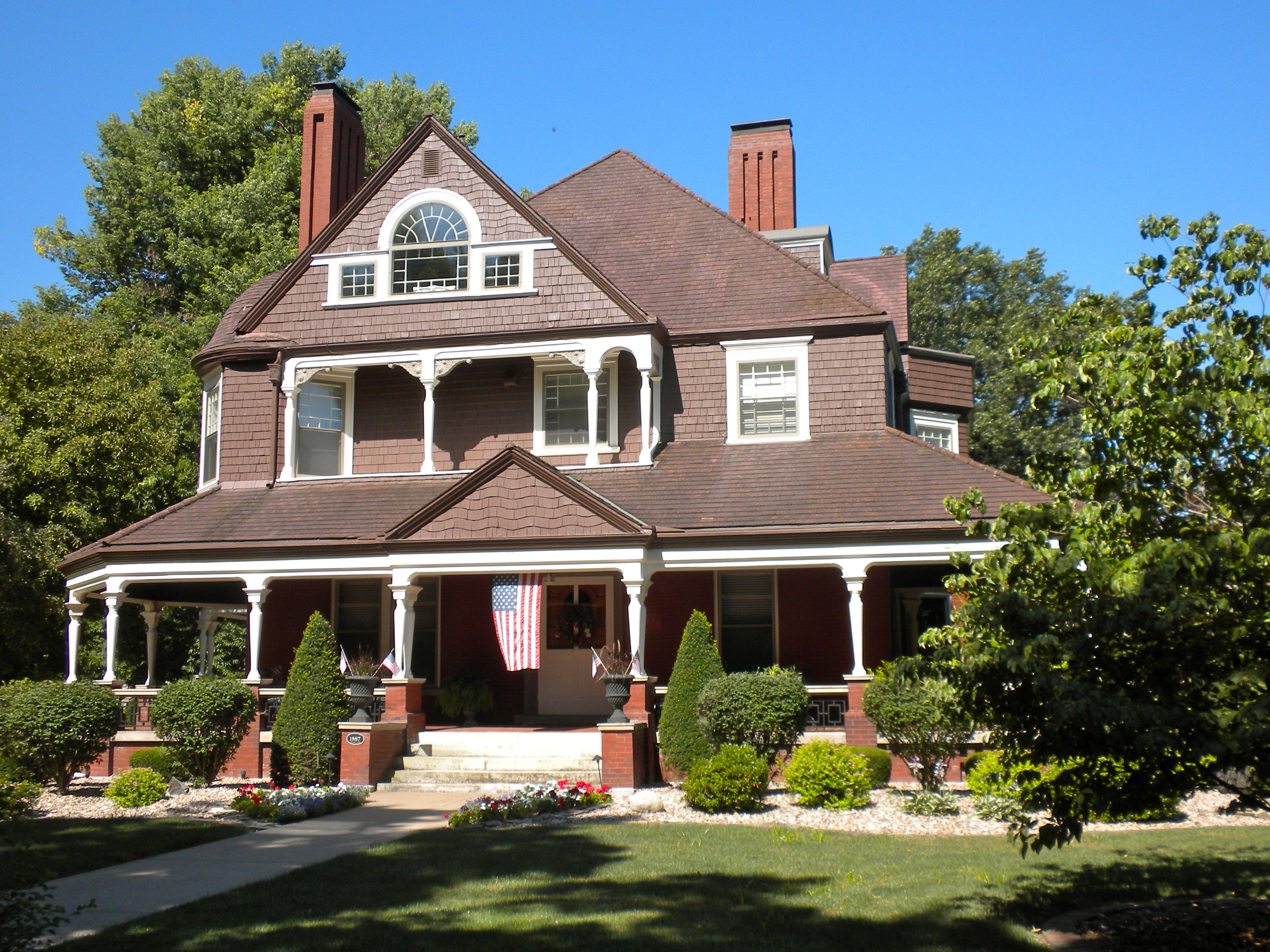

- Location within Illinois Location within the United States
- Location: Roughly bounded by Hampshire, Twenty-fourth, State, and Twelfth Sts., Quincy, Illinois
- Coordinates: 39°55′51″N 91°23′11″W
- Area: 250 acres (100 ha)
- NRHP reference No.: 85002791
- Added to NRHP: November 14, 1985

The Quincy East End Historic District is a residential historic district located on the east side of Quincy, Illinois. The district encompasses 493 contributing buildings built from the 1830s to the 1930s, including representative works of nearly every popular American architectural style during the period. The homes in the district were planned by designers of all skill levels, from local craftsmen to nationally significant architects, and the district developed naturally as formal and vernacular styles rose and fell in popularity. The Italianate and Gothic Revival styles are particularly common in the district. The John Wood Mansion, a Greek Revival home built in 1835 for Quincy's founder, John Wood, is one of the oldest and most significant homes in the district.

The district was added to the National Register of Historic Places on November 14, 1985.
