= Ernest M. Wood Office and Studio =

- U.S. National Register of Historic Places
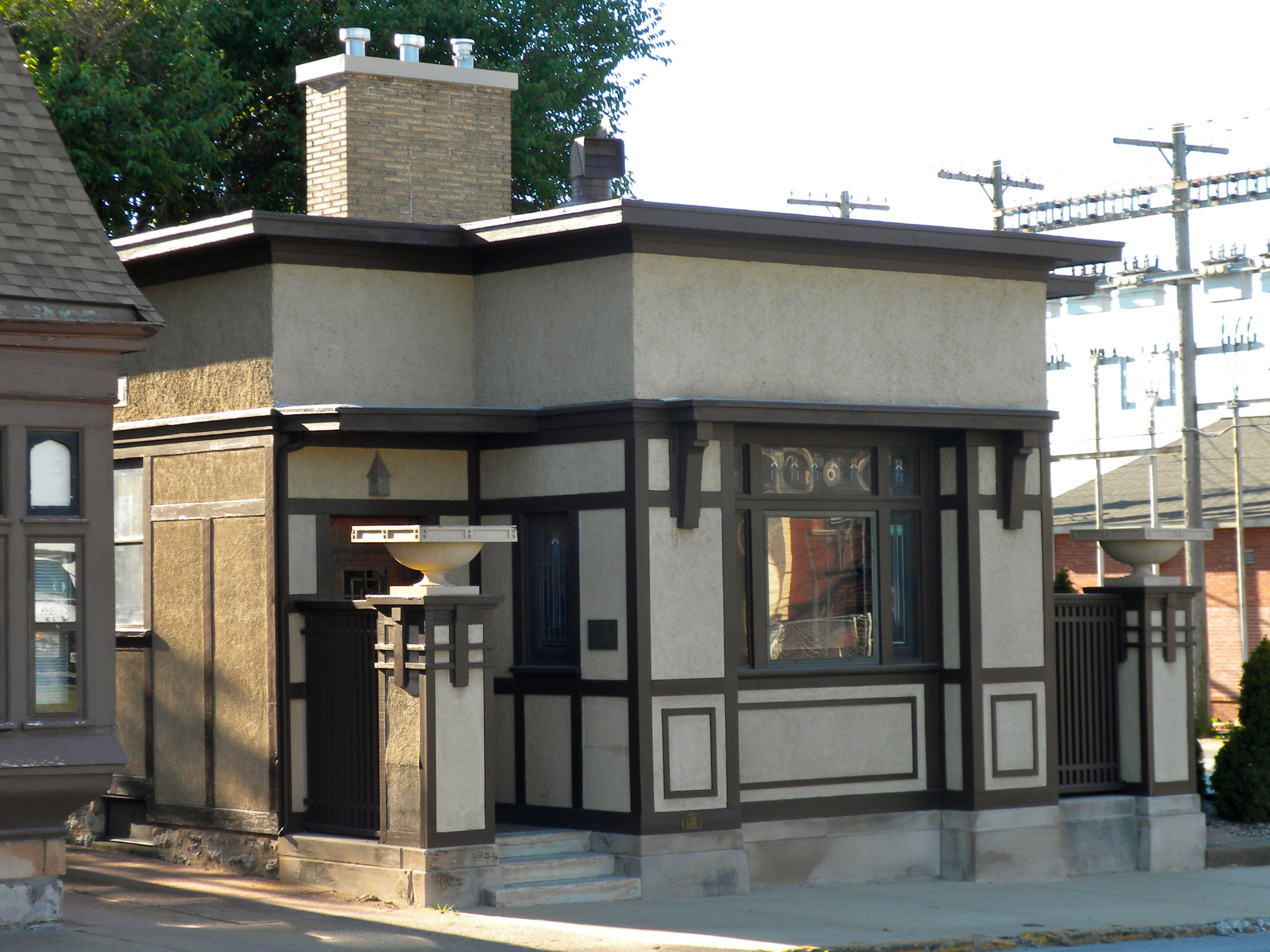

- Location within Illinois Location within the United States
- Location: 126 N. 8th St., Quincy, Illinois
- Coordinates: 39°55′57″N 91°24′10″W
- Area: less than one acre
- Built: 1911
- Architect: Ernest Michael Wood
- Architectural style: Prairie School
- NRHP reference No.: 82002517
- Added to NRHP: August 12, 1982

The Ernest M. Wood Office and Studio is a building located in the Adams County, Illinois city of Quincy. The building was designed by Quincy architect Ernest M. Wood and reflects the designs of Frank Lloyd Wright; as such it is an example of Prairie style architecture. The building, made of stucco and wood, was completed in 1912 and listed on the National Register of Historic Places on August 12, 1982. The Office and Studio incorporates typical elements of Prairie style architecture including geometric shapes and horizontals. The first of its kind in Quincy, it was also noted for its beige stucco walls and stained cypress trim.

The building measures 1,400 square feet and comprises a one-story building with finished partial basement. Wood's office also included a bank vault, given his specialty in designing banks. After retiring in 1938, Wood sold the building; today it continues to be used as an office. A restoration during the 1980s helped to repair such features as skylights, stained glass windows and built-in bookcases.
