= Lima, Illinois =

- Village
- Location of Lima in Adams County, Illinois.
- Coordinates: 40°10′37″N 91°22′35″W
- Country: US
- State: Illinois
- County: Adams
- Township: Lima
- Platted: 1833
- Named for: Lima, Peru

Area
  - Total: 0.14 sq mi (0.35 km^{2})
  - Land: 0.14 sq mi (0.35 km^{2})
  - Water: 0 sq mi (0.00 km^{2})
- Elevation: 650 ft (200 m)

Population (2020)
  - Total: 148
  - Estimate (2024): 143 ▼
  - Density: 1,100/sq mi (420/km^{2})
- Time zone: UTC-6 (CST)
  - Summer (DST): UTC-5 (CDT)
- ZIP Code(s): 62348
- Area code: 217
- FIPS code: 17-43445
- GNIS feature ID: 2398438

Lima /ˈlaɪmə/ is a village in Adams County, Illinois, United States. It is part of the Quincy, IL–MO Micropolitan Statistical Area. As of the 2020 census, the population was 148.

== History ==
Lima was platted in 1833, the year that the first store was established in the village, by Dr. Joseph Orr. Orr named the village Lima after Lima, Peru, on the suggestion of a Peruvian friend. In 1839 a large number of Latter-day Saints settled at this location. An LDS stake was organized here in 1840 and a conference here in 1841 had more than 400 Latter-day Saints presence. The Latter-day Saints left in 1845 due to mob violence.

As of 1955, Lima was the principal community of Lima Township, Illinois.

== Geography ==
Lima is located along Illinois State Route 96.

According to the 2021 census gazetteer files, Lima has a total area of 0.14 square miles (0.36 km^{2}), all land.

== Demographics ==
Historical population
Census	Pop.	Note	%±
1870	285		—
1880	250		−12.3%
1890	251		0.4%
1900	280		11.6%
1910	797		184.6%
1920	213		−73.3%
1930	198		−7.0%
1940	192		−3.0%
1950	154		−19.8%
1960	160		3.9%
1970	125		−21.9%
1980	166		32.8%
1990	120		−27.7%
2000	159		32.5%
2010	163		2.5%
2020	148		−9.2%
U.S. Decennial Census

As of the 2020 census there were 148 people, 48 households, and 38 families residing in the village. The population density was 1,096.30 inhabitants per square mile (423.28/km^{2}). There were 65 housing units at an average density of 481.48 per square mile (185.90/km^{2}). The racial makeup of the village was 95.95% White and 4.05% from two or more races. Hispanic or Latino of any race were 2.03% of the population.

There were 48 households, out of which 14.6% had children under the age of 18 living with them, 68.75% were married couples living together, 6.25% had a female householder with no husband present, and 20.83% were non-families. 16.67% of all households were made up of individuals, and 10.42% had someone living alone who was 65 years of age or older. The average household size was 2.34 and the average family size was 2.19.

The village's age distribution consisted of 12.4% under the age of 18, 2.9% from 18 to 24, 27.6% from 25 to 44, 33.4% from 45 to 64, and 23.8% who were 65 years of age or older. The median age was 53.7 years. For every 100 females, there were 69.4 males. For every 100 females age 18 and over, there were 70.4 males.

The median income for a household in the village was $58,750, and the median income for a family was $66,250. Males had a median income of $35,938 versus $24,583 for females. The per capita income for the village was $28,376. No families and 1.9% of the population were below the poverty line.
