= Mendon, Illinois =

- Village
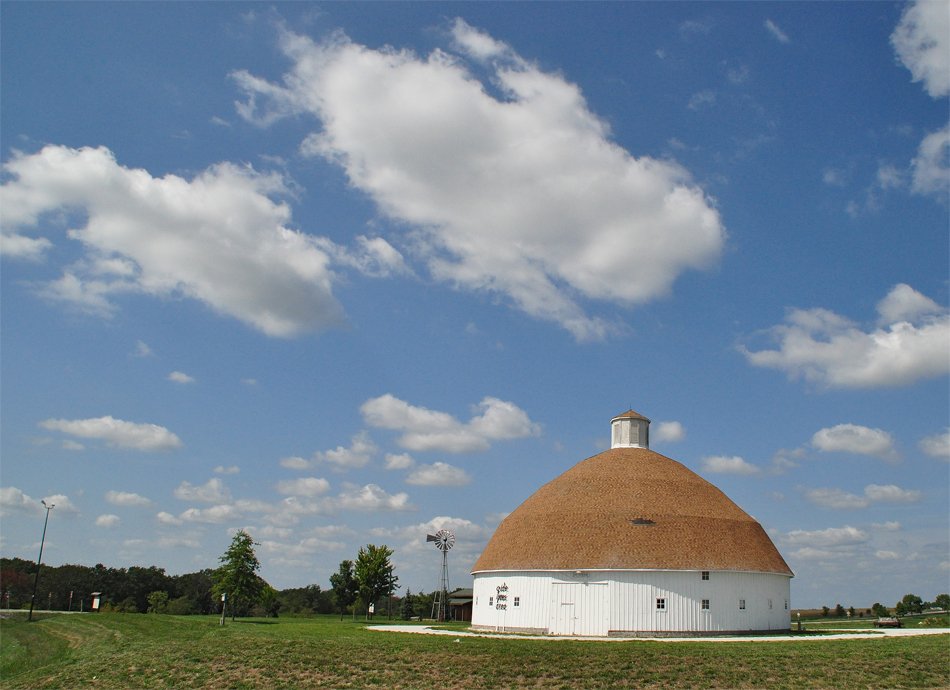
- Lewis Round Barn

- Location of Mendon in Adams County, Illinois.
- Coordinates: 40°05′21″N 91°17′09″W
- Country: US
- State: Illinois
- County: Adams
- Township: Mendon
- Established: 1833
- Incorporated: 1867
- Named for: Mendon, Massachusetts

Area
  - Total: 0.86 sq mi (2.22 km^{2})
  - Land: 0.86 sq mi (2.22 km^{2})
  - Water: 0 sq mi (0.00 km^{2})
- Elevation: 764 ft (233 m)

Population (2020)
  - Total: 872
  - Estimate (2024): 844 ▼
  - Density: 1,020/sq mi (393/km^{2})
- Time zone: UTC-6 (CST)
  - Summer (DST): UTC-5 (CDT)
- ZIP code: 62351
- Area code: 217
- FIPS code: 17-48307
- GNIS feature ID: 2399313
- Website: www.mendonillinois.com

Mendon is a village in Adams County, Illinois, United States. The population was 872 at the 2020 census. It is part of the Quincy, IL–MO Micropolitan Statistical Area.

The village is named after Mendon, Massachusetts.

== History ==
Mendon was platted in 1833 under the name of Fairfield. However, there was another Fairfield in Illinois, so the village name was changed to Mendon. In 1867, Mendon was incorporated as a village.

== Geography ==
According to the 2021 census gazetteer files, Mendon has a total area of 0.86 square miles (2.23 km^{2}), all land.

The community is in northwest Adams County on Illinois Route 61. Illinois Route 336 passes approximately one-half mile to the east. Quincy is eleven miles to the south-southwest. The headwaters of Ursa Creek arise southeast of the community and it flows to the west passing the south side of the community.

=== Registered Historic Places ===
- Lewis Round Barn

== Demographics ==
Historical population
Census	Pop.	Note	%±
1880	652		—
1890	640		−1.8%
1900	627		−2.0%
1910	640		2.1%
1920	645		0.8%
1930	580		−10.1%
1940	637		9.8%
1950	625		−1.9%
1960	784		25.4%
1970	883		12.6%
1980	979		10.9%
1990	854		−12.8%
2000	883		3.4%
2010	953		7.9%
2020	872		−8.5%
U.S. Decennial Census

As of the 2020 census there were 872 people, 394 households, and 287 families residing in the village. The population density was 1,017.50 inhabitants per square mile (392.86/km^{2}). There were 376 housing units at an average density of 438.74 per square mile (169.40/km^{2}). The racial makeup of the village was 95.41% White, 0.69% from other races, and 3.90% from two or more races. Hispanic or Latino of any race were 0.57% of the population.

There were 394 households, out of which 40.6% had children under the age of 18 living with them, 58.38% were married couples living together, 12.94% had a female householder with no husband present, and 27.16% were non-families. 26.14% of all households were made up of individuals, and 15.23% had someone living alone who was 65 years of age or older. The average household size was 3.16 and the average family size was 2.62.

The village's age distribution consisted of 29.6% under the age of 18, 3.9% from 18 to 24, 26.7% from 25 to 44, 21% from 45 to 64, and 18.8% who were 65 years of age or older. The median age was 37.8 years. For every 100 females, there were 92.9 males. For every 100 females age 18 and over, there were 82.7 males.

The median income for a household in the village was $56,000, and the median income for a family was $73,750. Males had a median income of $39,167 versus $30,268 for females. The per capita income for the village was $23,663. About 7.7% of families and 8.8% of the population were below the poverty line, including 13.9% of those under age 18 and 8.6% of those age 65 or over.
