= Meyer, Illinois =

Meyer
- Unincorporated community Census designated place
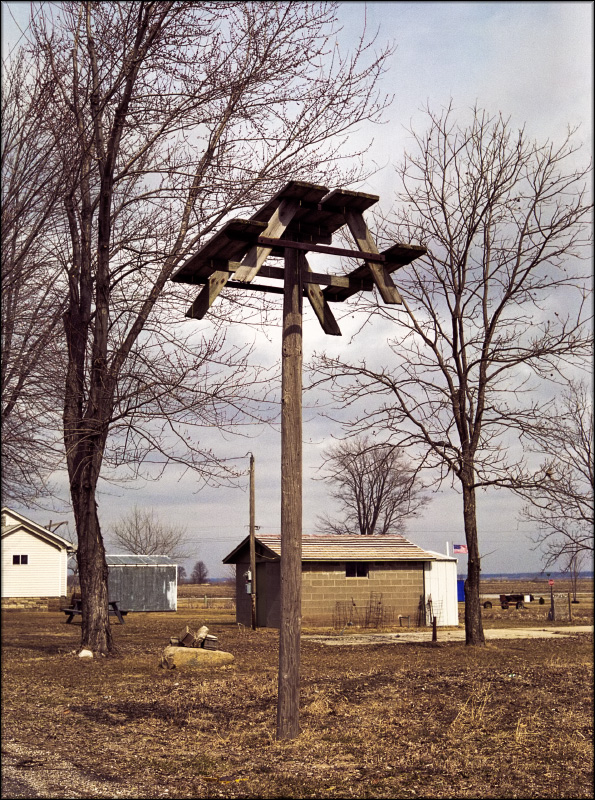
- Picnic table in Meyer, Illinois

- Location of Meyer within Illinois Meyer (the United States)
- Coordinates: 40°08′54″N 91°30′13″W
- Country: United States
- State: Illinois
- County: Adams
- Township: Lima
- Elevation: 486 ft (148 m)
- Time zone: UTC-6 (Central)
  - Summer (DST): UTC-5 (Central)
- Postal code: 62379
- Area code: 217
- GNIS feature ID: 2804088

Meyer is an unincorporated community and census designated place (CDP) in Adams County, Illinois, United States. As of the 2020 census, Meyer had a population of 18. The community is part of the Quincy, IL–MO Micropolitan Statistical Area. It is the westernmost community in Illinois.

== History ==
Meyer has been affected by floods throughout its history, the most notable occurring in 1944 and 1993. The community was again affected during an extensive flood event in June 2008.

On June 18, the Meyer levee was compromised, although most of the residents had left following a voluntary order earlier in the week.

== Geography ==
Meyer sits in a fertile flood plain along the east bank of the Mississippi River in northwestern Adams County. The river plays a significant role in the area's local economy. A large grain elevator lies to the south of the community.

Less than a mile from Meyer is the Canton, Missouri ferry landing that connects the community with the state of Missouri. The ferry ceased operation in the spring of 2014.

== Demographics ==
Meyer first appeared as a census designated place in the 2020 U.S. census.
