= Ursa, Illinois =

- Village
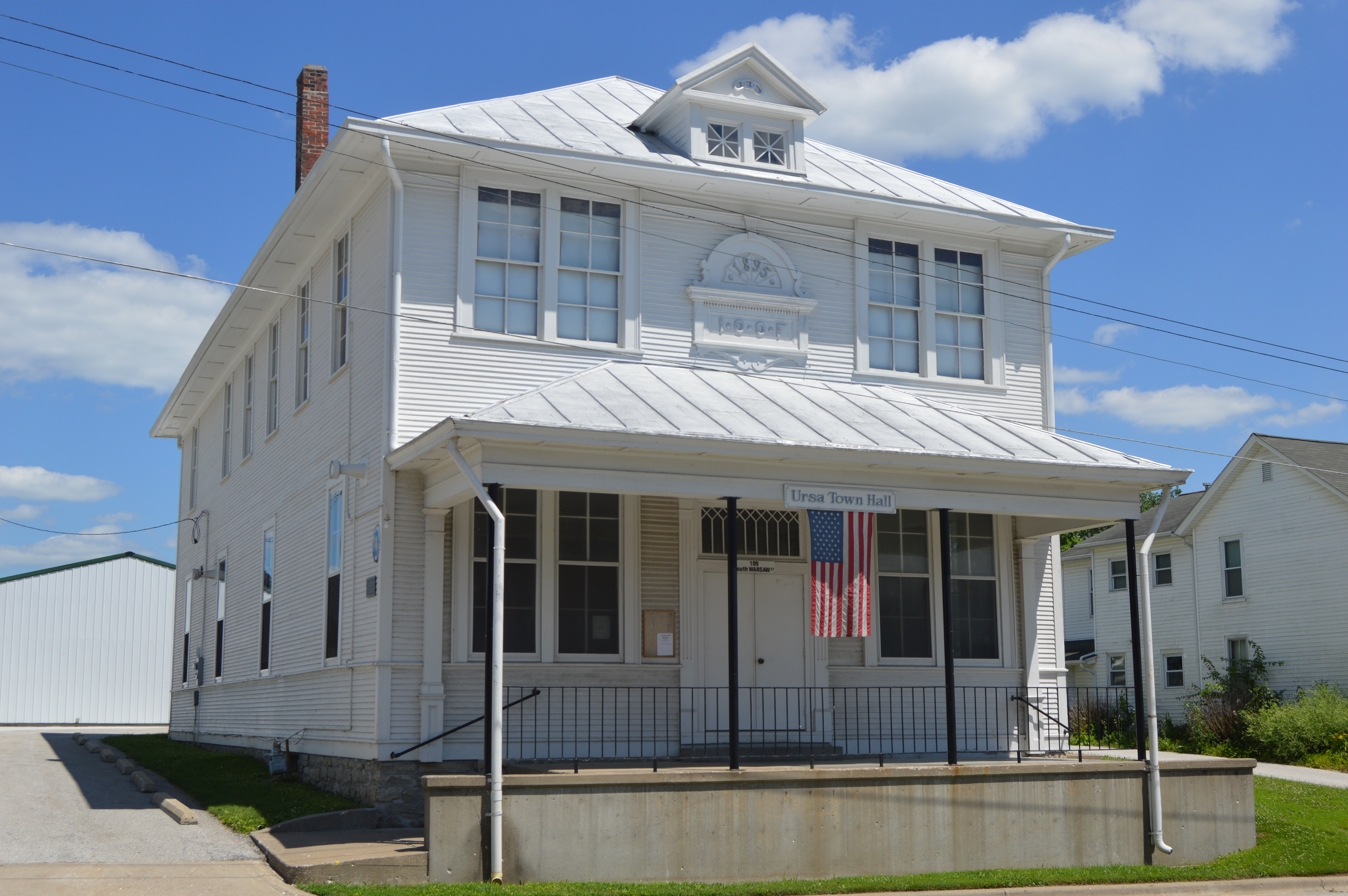
- Ursa's village hall

- Location of Ursa in Adams County, Illinois.
- Coordinates: 40°04′28″N 91°22′26″W
- Country: United States
- State: Illinois
- County: Adams
- Township: Ursa
- Founded: 1828
- Incorporated: 1964

Area
  - Total: 0.69 sq mi (1.79 km^{2})
  - Land: 0.69 sq mi (1.79 km^{2})
  - Water: 0 sq mi (0.00 km^{2})
- Elevation: 591 ft (180 m)

Population (2020)
  - Total: 609
  - Estimate (2024): 588 ▼
  - Density: 881/sq mi (340/km^{2})
- Time zone: UTC-6 (CST)
  - Summer (DST): UTC-5 (CDT)
- ZIP code: 62376
- Area code: 217
- FIPS code: 17-77044
- GNIS feature ID: 2400033
- Website: ursavillage.org

Ursa is a village in Adams County, Illinois, United States. The population was 609 at the 2020 census. It is part of the Quincy, IL–MO Micropolitan Statistical Area.

== History ==
The first settlers came to Ursa in 1823. Ursa was established in 1828 and became an incorporated village in 1964.

== Geography ==
According to the 2021 census gazetteer files, Ursa has a total area of 0.69 square miles (1.79 km^{2}), all land.

== Demographics ==
Historical population
Census	Pop.	Note	%±
1880	123		—
1970	423		—
1980	454		7.3%
1990	506		11.5%
2000	595		17.6%
2010	626		5.2%
2020	609		−2.7%
U.S. Decennial Census

As of the 2020 census there were 609 people, 245 households, and 144 families residing in the village. The population density was 882.61 inhabitants per square mile (340.78/km^{2}). There were 268 housing units at an average density of 388.41 per square mile (149.97/km^{2}). The racial makeup of the village was 93.27% White, 0.16% Native American, 0.16% Asian, 1.64% from other races, and 4.76% from two or more races. Hispanic or Latino of any race were 0.49% of the population.

There were 245 households, out of which 26.9% had children under the age of 18 living with them, 50.61% were married couples living together, 8.16% had a female householder with no husband present, and 41.22% were non-families. 33.47% of all households were made up of individuals, and 12.24% had someone living alone who was 65 years of age or older. The average household size was 2.86 and the average family size was 2.21.

The village's age distribution consisted of 24.4% under the age of 18, 6.7% from 18 to 24, 26.6% from 25 to 44, 22.5% from 45 to 64, and 19.8% who were 65 years of age or older. The median age was 38.4 years. For every 100 females, there were 113.8 males. For every 100 females age 18 and over, there were 99.5 males.

The median income for a household in the village was $46,719, and the median income for a family was $72,500. Males had a median income of $42,361 versus $30,000 for females. The per capita income for the village was $29,957. About 1.4% of families and 4.3% of the population were below the poverty line, including 3.1% of those under age 18 and 2.8% of those age 65 or over.

== Registered Historic Place ==
- Ursa Town Hall
