= Camp Point, Illinois =

- Village
- Logo

- Location of Camp Point in Adams County, Illinois.
- Coordinates: 40°01′51″N 91°04′16″W
- Country: United States
- State: Illinois
- County: Adams
- Township: Camp Point
- Established: 1835
- Founder: Peter Garrett

Area
  - Total: 1.27 sq mi (3.28 km^{2})
  - Land: 1.27 sq mi (3.28 km^{2})
  - Water: 0 sq mi (0.00 km^{2})
- Elevation: 732 ft (223 m)

Population (2020)
  - Total: 1,121
  - Estimate (2024): 1,117 ▼
  - Density: 885/sq mi (342/km^{2})
- Time zone: UTC-6 (CST)
  - Summer (DST): UTC-5 (CDT)
- ZIP code: 62320
- Area code: 217
- FIPS code: 17-10877
- GNIS feature ID: 2397542
- Website: www.camppoint.com

Camp Point is a village in Adams County, Illinois, United States. The population was 1,121 at the 2020 census, down from 1,132 at the 2010 census. It is part of the Quincy, IL–MO Micropolitan Statistical Area.

== History ==
Camp Point was founded in 1835 by Peter Garrett and was originally called Garrett's Mills. A school house was built here in 1836. Then a family named the Farlow started to build the town more.

== Geography ==
According to the 2021 census gazetteer files, Camp Point has a total area of 1.27 square miles (3.29 km^{2}), all land.

=== Registered Historic Places ===
- F. D. Thomas House

== Demographics ==
Historical population
Census	Pop.	Note	%±
1880	1,131		—
1890	1,150		1.7%
1900	1,260		9.6%
1910	1,148		−8.9%
1920	994		−13.4%
1930	1,000		0.6%
1940	1,084		8.4%
1950	969		−10.6%
1960	1,092		12.7%
1970	1,143		4.7%
1980	1,285		12.4%
1990	1,230		−4.3%
2000	1,244		1.1%
2010	1,132		−9.0%
2020	1,121		−1.0%
U.S. Decennial Census

=== 2020 census ===
As of the 2020 census, Camp Point had a population of 1,121, including 267 families. The population density was 886.17 inhabitants per square mile (342.15/km^{2}).

The median age was 37.9 years. 26.3% of residents were under the age of 18 and 17.2% of residents were 65 years of age or older. For every 100 females, there were 92.3 males, and for every 100 females age 18 and over, there were 87.3 males age 18 and over.

0.0% of residents lived in urban areas, while 100.0% lived in rural areas.

There were 416 households in Camp Point, of which 33.4% had children under the age of 18 living in them. Of all households, 51.0% were married-couple households, 14.7% were households with a male householder and no spouse or partner present, and 26.9% were households with a female householder and no spouse or partner present. About 26.2% of all households were made up of individuals and 10.9% had someone living alone who was 65 years of age or older. The average household size was 3.34 and the average family size was 2.57.

There were 468 housing units at an average density of 369.96 per square mile (142.84/km^{2}), of which 11.1% were vacant. The homeowner vacancy rate was 1.2% and the rental vacancy rate was 11.0%.

Racial composition as of the 2020 census
Race	Number	Percent
White	1,056	94.2%
Black or African American	3	0.3%
American Indian and Alaska Native	2	0.2%
Asian	5	0.4%
Native Hawaiian and Other Pacific Islander	0	0.0%
Some other race	8	0.7%
Two or more races	47	4.2%
Hispanic or Latino (of any race)	18	1.6%

=== Income and poverty ===
The median income for a household in the village was $52,794, and the median income for a family was $64,821. Males had a median income of $41,065 versus $26,343 for females. The per capita income for the village was $23,555. About 3.7% of families and 5.9% of the population were below the poverty line, including 5.2% of those under age 18 and 13.2% of those age 65 or over.

== Notable people ==
- Allan Nevins (1890–1971), journalist and historian; born in Camp Point
- Arthur S. Nevins (1891–1979), brigadier general in the United States Army
- Paul Reuschel, pitcher for the Chicago Cubs and Cleveland Indians
- Rick Reuschel, Major league All-Star pitcher
- Elizabeth Stanley, actress
- Pinch Thomas (1888–1953), catcher for the Boston Red Sox and Cleveland Indians
