= List of Coca-Cola buildings and structures =

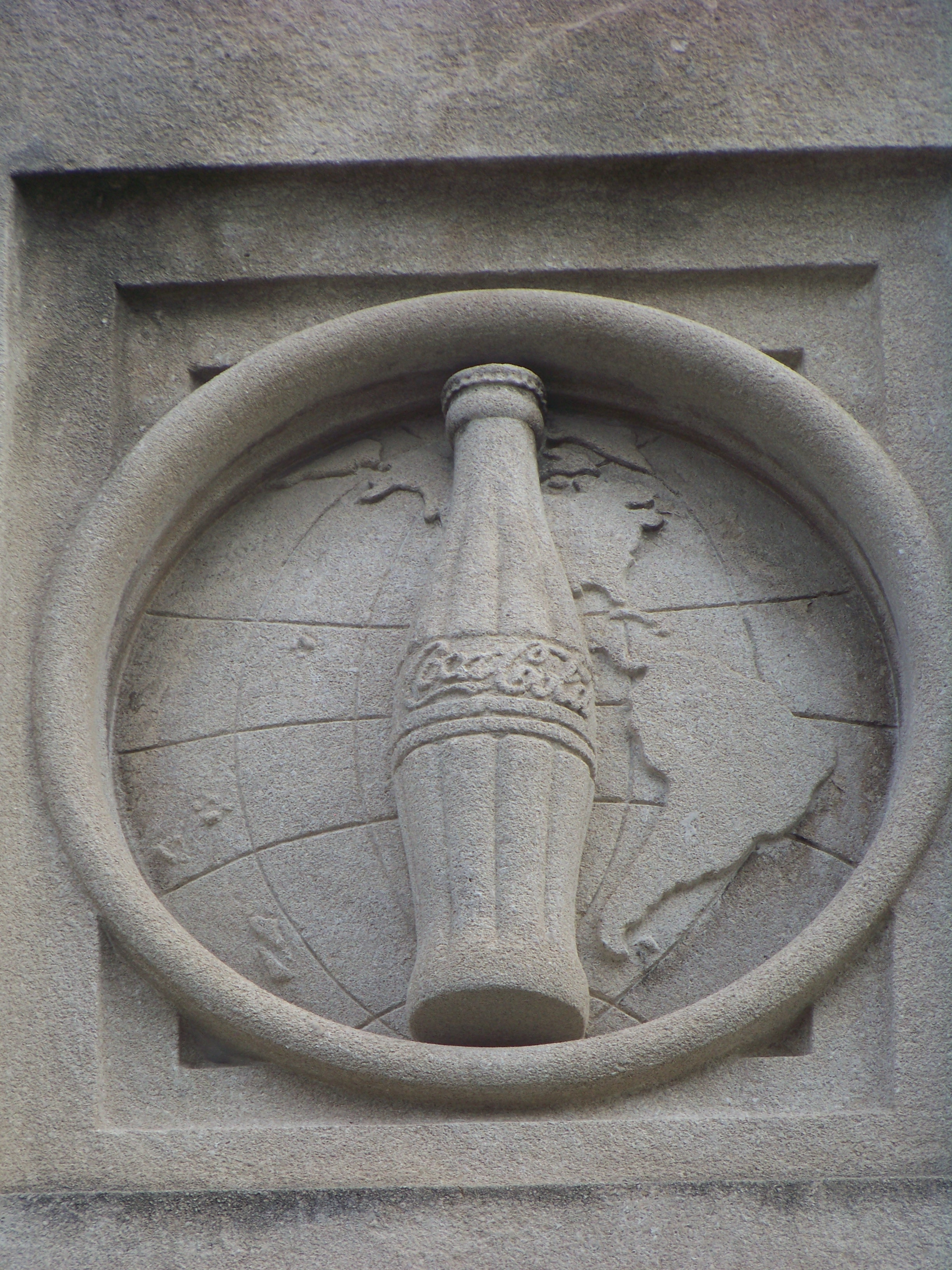
Coke bottle design in the facade of the Elmira Building

The following buildings and structures are related to The Coca-Cola Company or their bottlers. As of 2012, 900 factories and bottleries served the company, and many buildings formerly used by the company have been added to heritage registers.

During the early 20th century, Coca-Cola's in-house architect, Jesse M. Shelton, used a compendium of architectural styles but typically included elaborate flourishes, including Coke bottle designs in the facades, to help promote the company's image. During the depression in the 1930s, Coca-Cola often spent $500,000–$600,000 on elaborate bottling plants but, because they are commercial buildings, traditional architects have often overlooked their beauty.

Atlanta, Georgia, architects Pringle and Smith designed buildings and created standardized designs for Coca-Cola bottling plants, including one located in Tifton Residential Historic District:

The 1937 Tifton Coca-Cola Bottling Plant is located at 820 Love Avenue. The building is a two-story, brick, commercial Beaux Arts-style building with tile roof, heavy modillions under the cornice, metal factory sash-windows, leaded-glass transoms over plate glass display windows, and decorative cast-concrete door surround. Terra-cotta panels with the trademark "Coca-Cola" emblem are located on the façade and side elevations. Designed by the Atlanta architectural firm Pringle and Smith, the building is an example of "Standardized Coca Cola Bottling Plant, Model 3A." Between 1928 and the late 1940s, Pringle and Smith designed a series of plans for bottling plant franchises for the Coca-Cola Company that were built throughout the southeastern United States.

== United States ==
Selected Coca-Cola buildings in the United States, by state and city
Building	Image	City	State	Type	Coord	Notes	Ref.
Coca-Cola Building (Morrilton, Arkansas)		Morrilton	Arkansas	Bottling plant	35°9′15″N 92°44′35″W	NRHP	
Coca-Cola Ship Building		Los Angeles	California	Bottling plant	34°1′43″N 118°14′42″W	LA Historic-Cultural Monument	
Coca-Cola Ft. Lauderdale		Fort Lauderdale	Florida	Bottling plant		Broward Trust for Historic Preservation's Significant and Endangered Sites in Broward County, Florida	
Club Cool		Lake Buena Vista	Florida	Attraction		Within Walt Disney's Epcot	
Florida Coca-Cola		Ocala	Florida	Bottling plant	29°11′47″N 82°8′11″W	NRHP	
Coca-Cola Trenton		Trenton	Florida	Bottling plant			
Coca-Cola Bottling Plant-Athens		Athens	Georgia	Bottling plant	33°57′35″N 83°23′0″W	NRHP	
Candler Building (1906)		Atlanta	Georgia	Office building	33°45′24″N 84°23′17″W	NRHP	
Coca-Cola Annex		Atlanta	Georgia	Office building	33°45′21″N 84°22′53″W	NRHP	
Coca-Cola headquarters		Atlanta	Georgia	Office building		Includes One Coca-Cola Place	
Coca-Cola Olympic City		Atlanta	Georgia	Attraction		1996 Summer Olympics	
Dixie Bottling Plant		Atlanta	Georgia	Bottling plant	34°12′16″N 84°22′10″W	Listed as a National Historic Landmark; now part of Georgia State University	
World of Coca-Cola		Atlanta	Georgia	Attraction	33°45′46″N 84°23′34″W	Within Pemberton Place	
Tifton Coca-Cola Bottling Plant		Tifton	Georgia	Bottling plant	820 Love Avenue; 31.46121°N 83.50658°W	A contributing building in Tifton Residential Historic District	
Chicago Coca-Cola		Chicago	Illinois	Office and syrup plant	41°51′54″N 87°37′34″W	NRHP	
Coca-Cola Bottling Company Building (Quincy, Illinois)		Quincy	Illinois	Bottling plant	39°56′18″N 91°22′37″W	NRHP	
Coca-Cola Bloomington		Bloomington	Indiana	Bottling plant	39°9′50″N 86°31′57″W	NRHP	
Coca-Cola Bottling Company of Indianapolis		Indianapolis	Indiana	Bottling plant		part of the Massachusetts Avenue Historic District	
Coca-Cola Bottling Company Building		Atlantic	Iowa	Bottling plant			
Coca-Cola Bottling Plant		Spirit Lake	Iowa	Bottling plant			
Paducah Coca-Cola Bottling Company		Paducah	Kentucky	Bottling plant		NRHP	
Shelbyville Coke Plant		Shelbyville	Kentucky	Bottling plant	38°12′36″N 85°12′24″W	NRHP	
Coca-Cola Bottling Plant (Bogalusa, Louisiana)		Bogalusa	Louisiana	Bottling plant	30°47′22″N 89°51′55″W	NRHP	
Biedenharn Museum and Gardens		Monroe	Louisiana	Museum	32°31′11″N 92°7′52″W		
Coca-Cola Branch Factory		Baltimore	Maryland	Syrup plant	39°16′7″N 76°35′53″W	NRHP	
Old Coca-Cola Bottling Plan		Belzoni	Mississippi	Bottling plant			
McComb Coca-Cola Bottling Company		McComb	Mississippi	Bottling plant			
Coca-Cola Bottling Company Building (Columbia, Missouri)		Columbia	Missouri	Bottling plant	38°57′3″N 92°19′30″W	Ragtag Cinema	
Coca-Cola Building		Kansas City	Missouri	Office building	39°5′16″N 94°34′52″W	NRHP	
Coca-Cola Syrup Plant		St. Louis	Missouri	Syrup plant	38°32′44.55″N 90°15′57.01″W	NRHP	
Everything Coca-Cola		Paradise	Nevada	Attraction			
Shoshone Coca-Cola Bottling		Reno	Nevada	Bottling plant			
Coca-Cola Works		Elmira	New York	Bottling plant	42°5′21″N 76°48′58″W	NRHP	
Candler Building (1914)		New York City	New York	Office building	40°45′22″N 73°59′18″W	NRHP	
Coca-Cola sign		New York City	New York	Billboard sign		Times Square	
Coca-Cola Bottling Plant		Charlotte	North Carolina	Bottling plant	35°13′43″N 80°51′52″W	NRHP	
Coca-Cola Bottling Corporation		Cincinnati	Ohio	Bottling plant	39°8′47″N 84°28′26″W	NRHP; now part of Xavier University	
Coca Cola Airport		Corvallis	Oregon	Airport	44°25′19″N 123°15′32″W	(FAA LID: OG49)	
Coca-Cola Park		Allentown	Pennsylvania	Sports venue	40°37′34″N 75°27′9″W	Home field for the IronPigs	
Coca Cola Beverages Northeast		Providence	Rhode Island	Distribution center	41°49′52.7″N 71°25′39.8″W		
Coca-Cola Bottling Plant (Greenville, South Carolina)		Greenville	South Carolina	Bottling plant	34.8565°N 82.4028°W	Now the Sigal Music Museum; only the front of the plant survives	
Coca-Cola Covington		Covington	Tennessee	Bottling plant	35°33′51″N 89°38′58″W	NRHP	
Beeville Coca-Cola Bottling Co.		Beeville	Texas	Bottling plant			
Office Building - Coca-Cola Bottling Plant		Covington	Virginia	Bottling plant			
Coca-Cola Works		Winchester	Virginia	Bottling plant	39°10′14.02″N 78°10′38.34″W	NRHP	

== Other countries ==
Selected Coca-Cola buildings outside the United States, by country and city
Building	Image	City	Country	Type	Coordinates	Notes	Ref.
Coca-Cola billboard		Sydney	Australia	Billboard sign	33°52′30.93″S 151°13′20.04″E	In Kings Cross locality	
Coca-Cola Coliseum		Toronto	Canada	Sports venue	43°38′08.27″N 79°24′54.14″W		

== Gallery ==
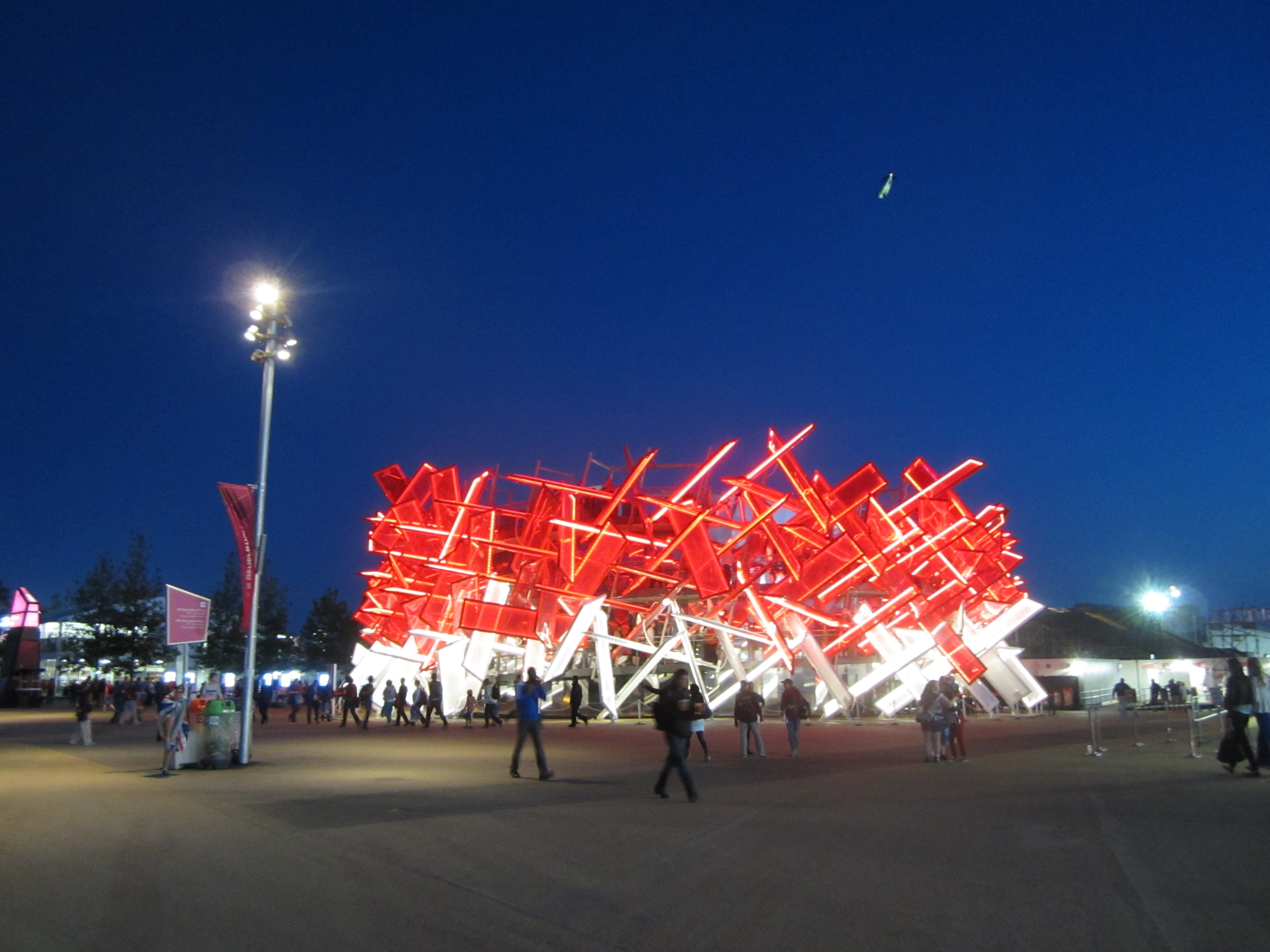
Pavilion in London at 2012 Summer Olympics

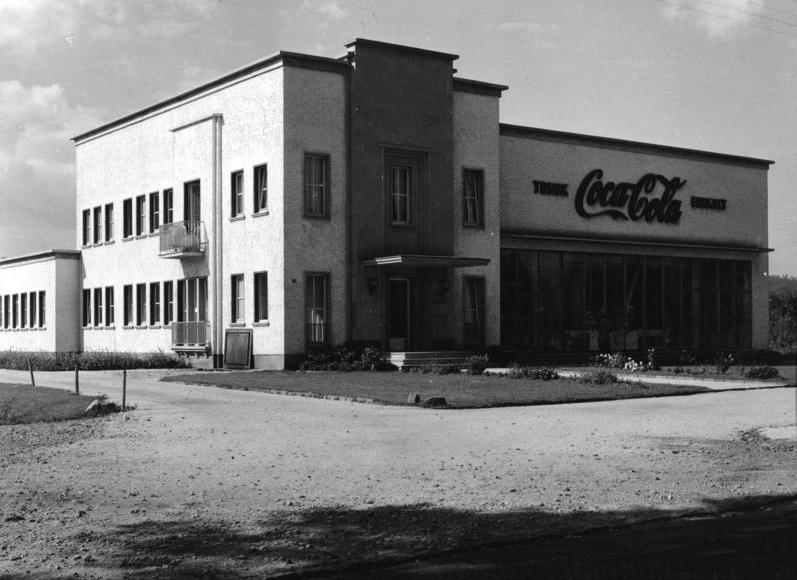
Bottling plant in Bonn, Germany

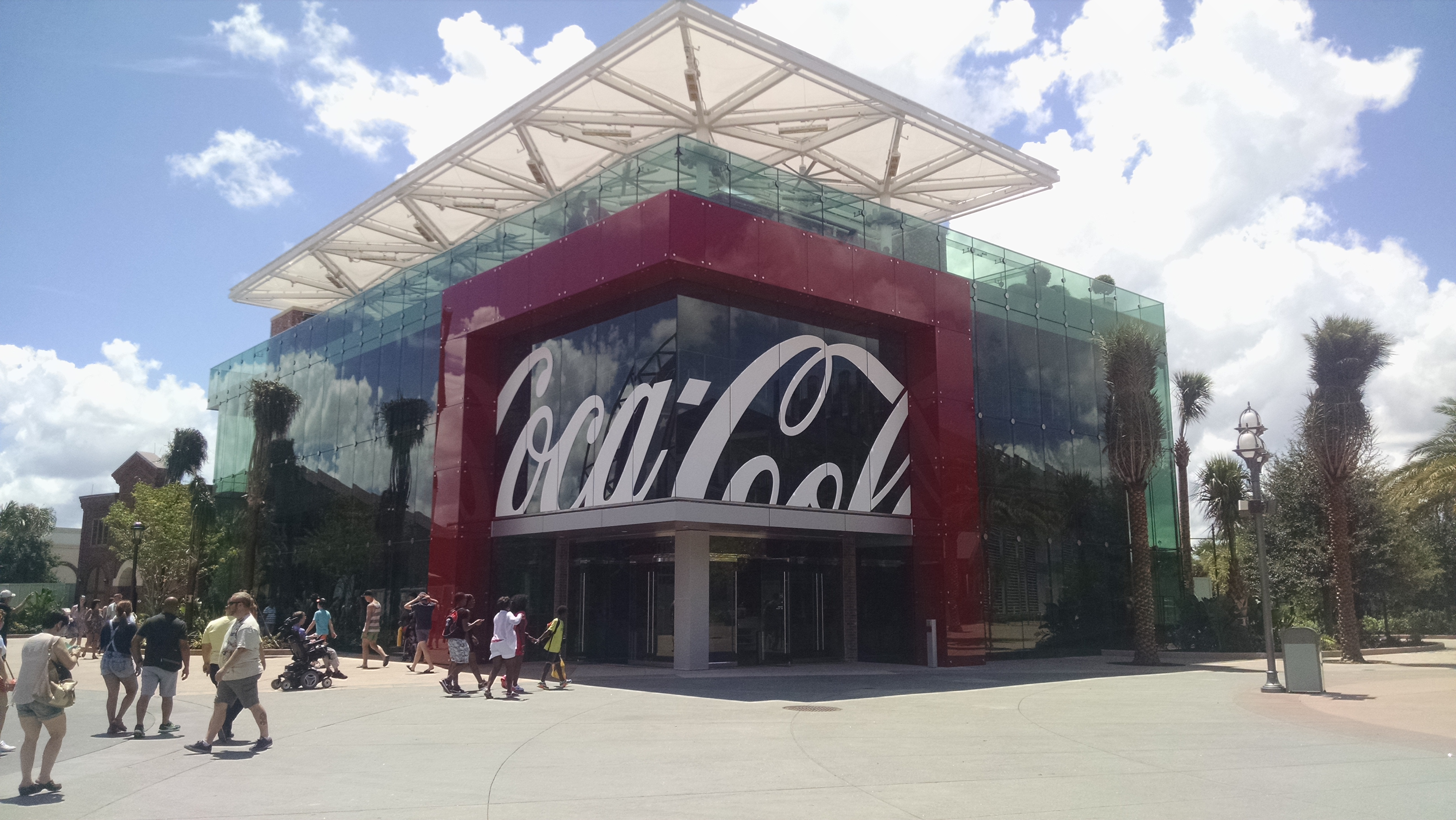
Store in Orlando, Florida, at Disney Springs

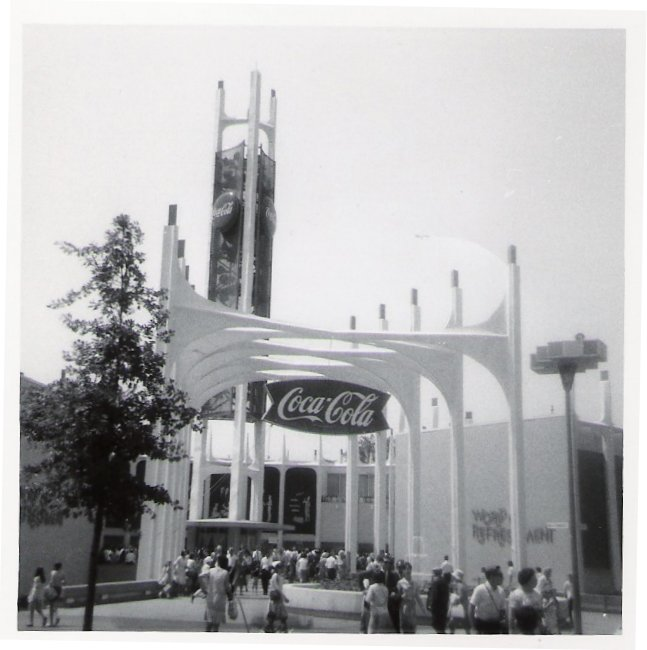
Pavilion in New York City at 1964 World's Fair

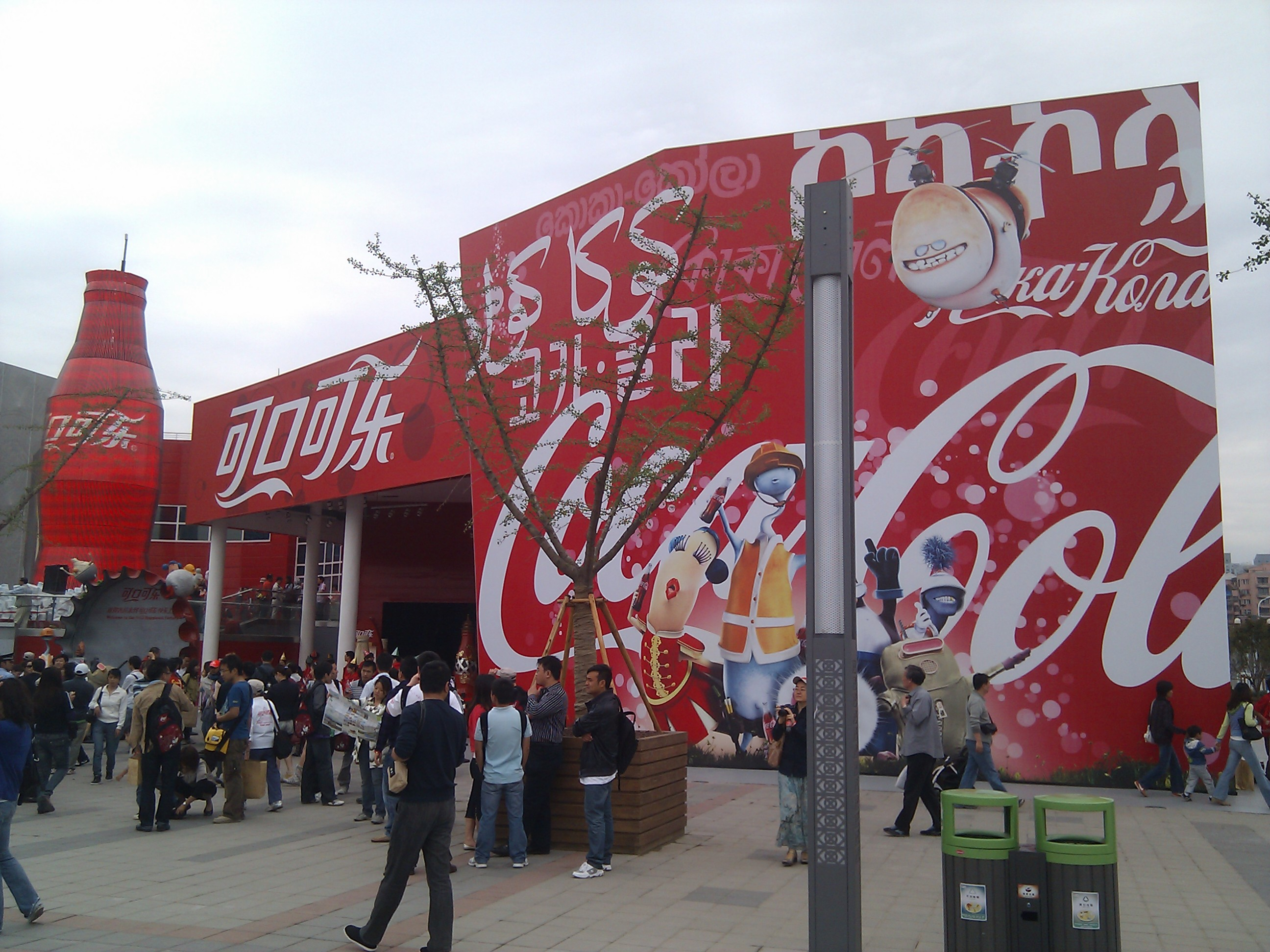
Pavilion in Shanghai at Expo 2010
