= Courtney Stewart (disambiguation) =

Courtney Stewart is an American record industry executive, founder of Keep Cool Records.

Courtney Stewart may also refer to:

- Courtney Stewart, American architect, designer of the Coca-Cola Bottling Plant in Fort Lauderdale, Florida
- Courtney Stewart, Scottish professional wrestler known by her ring name Isla Dawn
- Courtney Stewart (dramatist), Australian actor and theatre director, artistic director of La Boite Theatre Company from 2022
- Courtney Stewart, cheerleader, driver of the car in which American baseball player Nick Adenhart was killed in 2009

== See also ==
- Courtenay Stewart (born 1985), Canadian synchronised swimming athlete
