= Coca-Cola Bottling Company of Baltimore Building =

- U.S. National Register of Historic Places
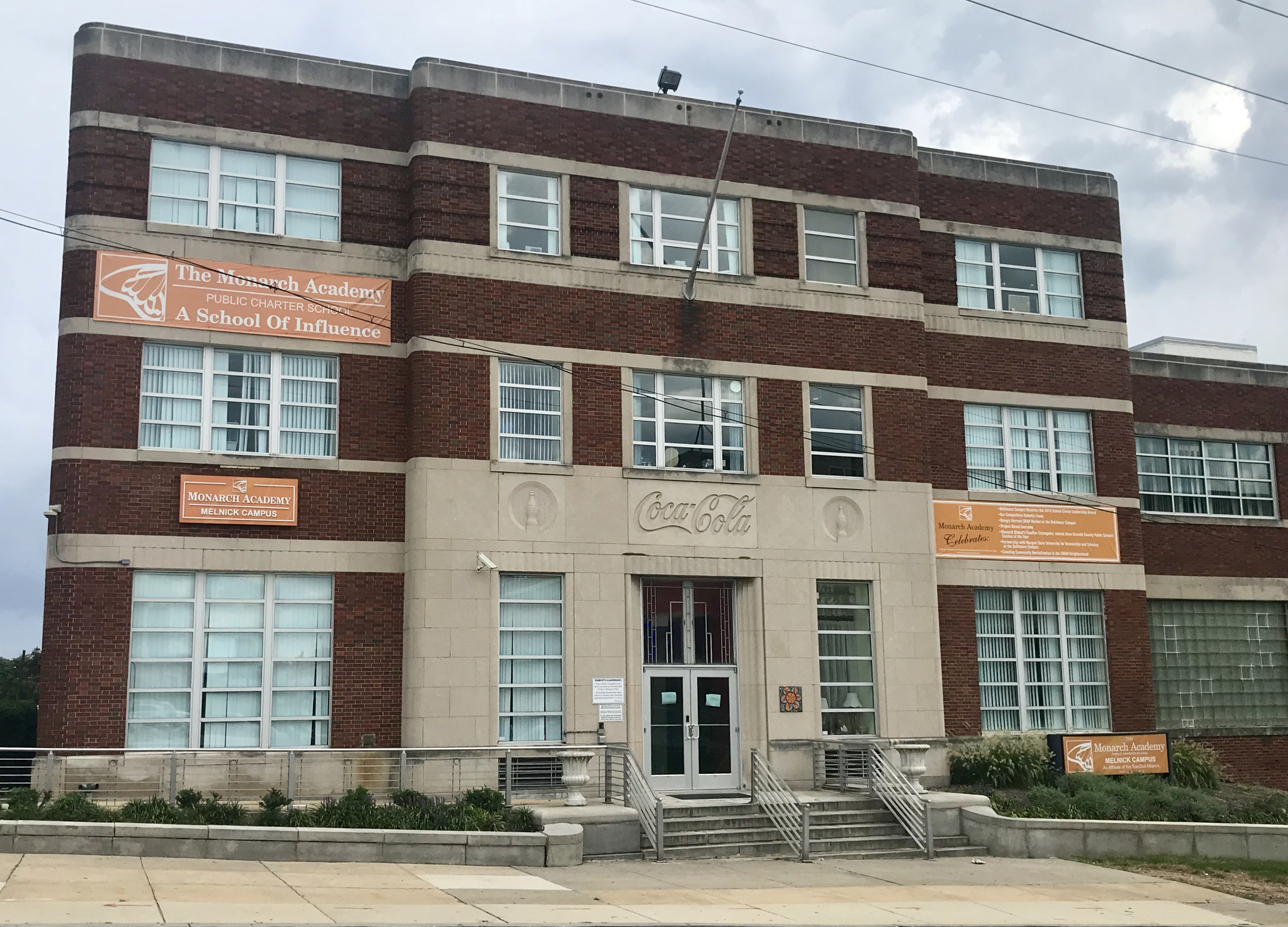

- Location within Baltimore Location within Maryland Location within the United States
- Location: 2525 Kirk Ave., Baltimore, Maryland
- Coordinates: 39°19′8″N 76°36′1″W
- Built: 1939
- Architectural style: Moderne
- NRHP reference No.: 13000847
- Added to NRHP: October 23, 2013

The Coca-Cola Bottling Company of Baltimore Building is a historic industrial building at 2525 Kirk Avenue in Baltimore, Maryland. The Moderne style building was built in 1939. The building includes hallmarks of the style, including rounded corners, horizontal bands of stonework, and stylized relief panels with renditions of the Coca-Cola Company logo.

The building was listed on the National Register of Historic Places in 2013.

The building is currently home to the Baltimore Collegiate School for Boys. The Coca-Cola logo has been covered by a school banner.

== See also ==
- Coca-Cola Baltimore Branch Factory
- List of Coca-Cola buildings and structures
- National Register of Historic Places listings in East and Northeast Baltimore
