= Elmira Coca-Cola Bottling Company Works =

- U.S. National Register of Historic Places
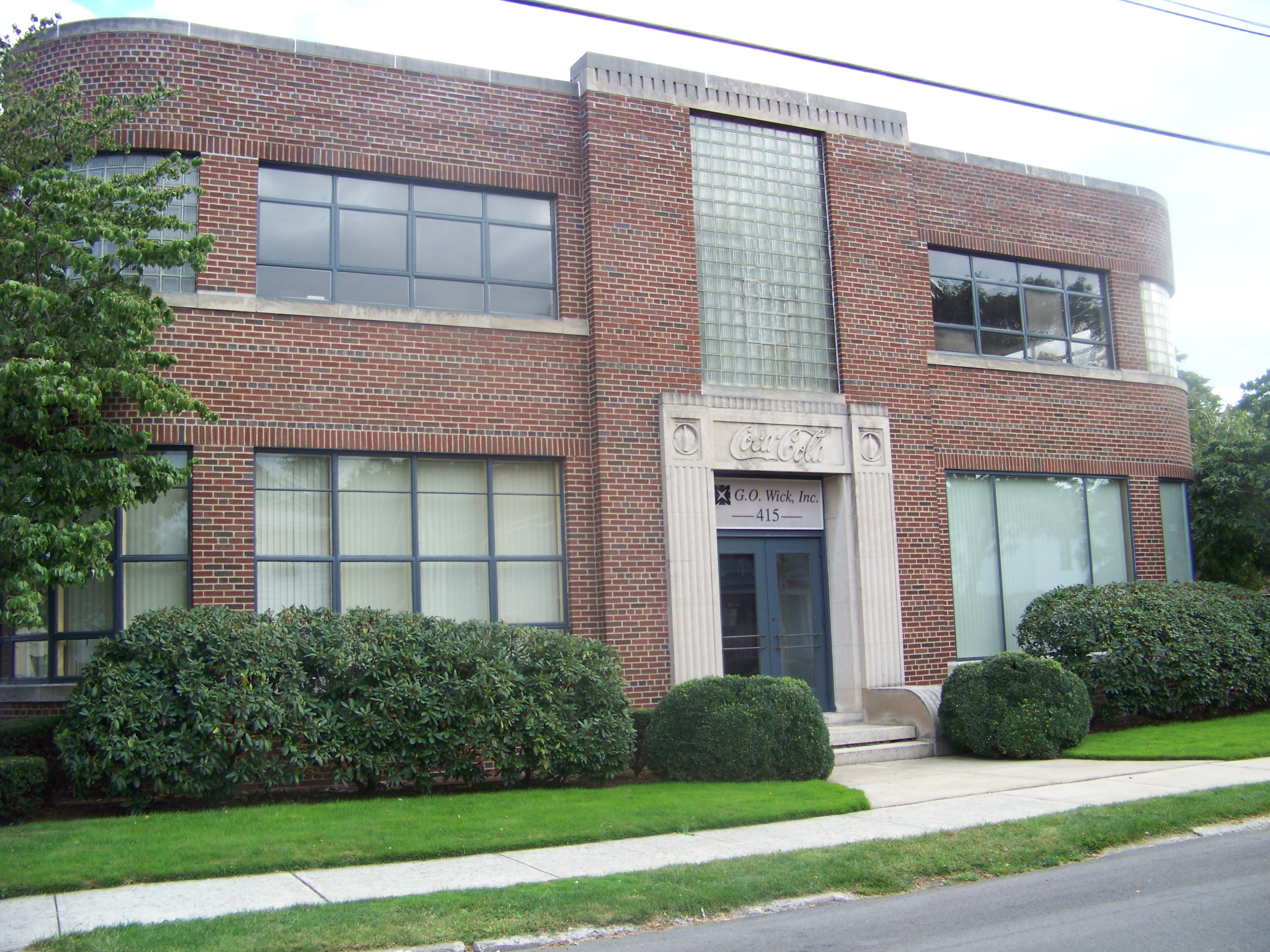

- Location within New York Location within the United States
- Location: Elmira, New York
- Coordinates: 42°5′21″N 76°48′58″W
- Built: 1939
- Architect: White, Louis Read, Jr.
- Architectural style: Moderne
- NRHP reference No.: 97000423
- Added to NRHP: May 23, 1997

The Elmira Coca-Cola Bottling Company Works is located at 415 West Second Street, Elmira, New York. It was built in 1939 in the Art Moderne style. The building was designed by architect Lucius Read White, Jr. The structure is significant for its architecture and its role in industry, and was added to the National Register of Historic Places in 1997.

The building is no longer a bottling plant and now used by International Brotherhood of Electrical Workers Local 139.

== Gallery ==
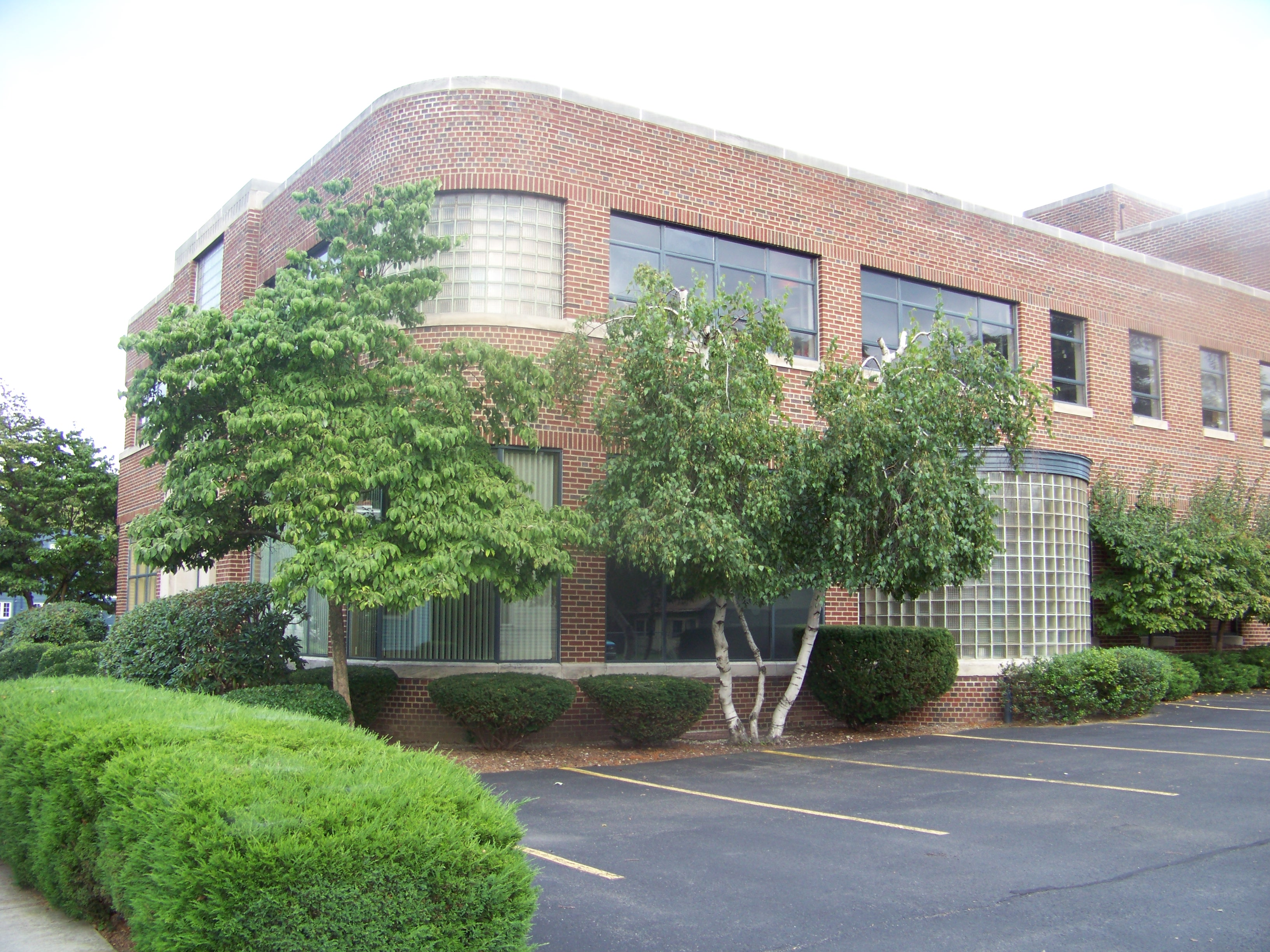
Western elevation

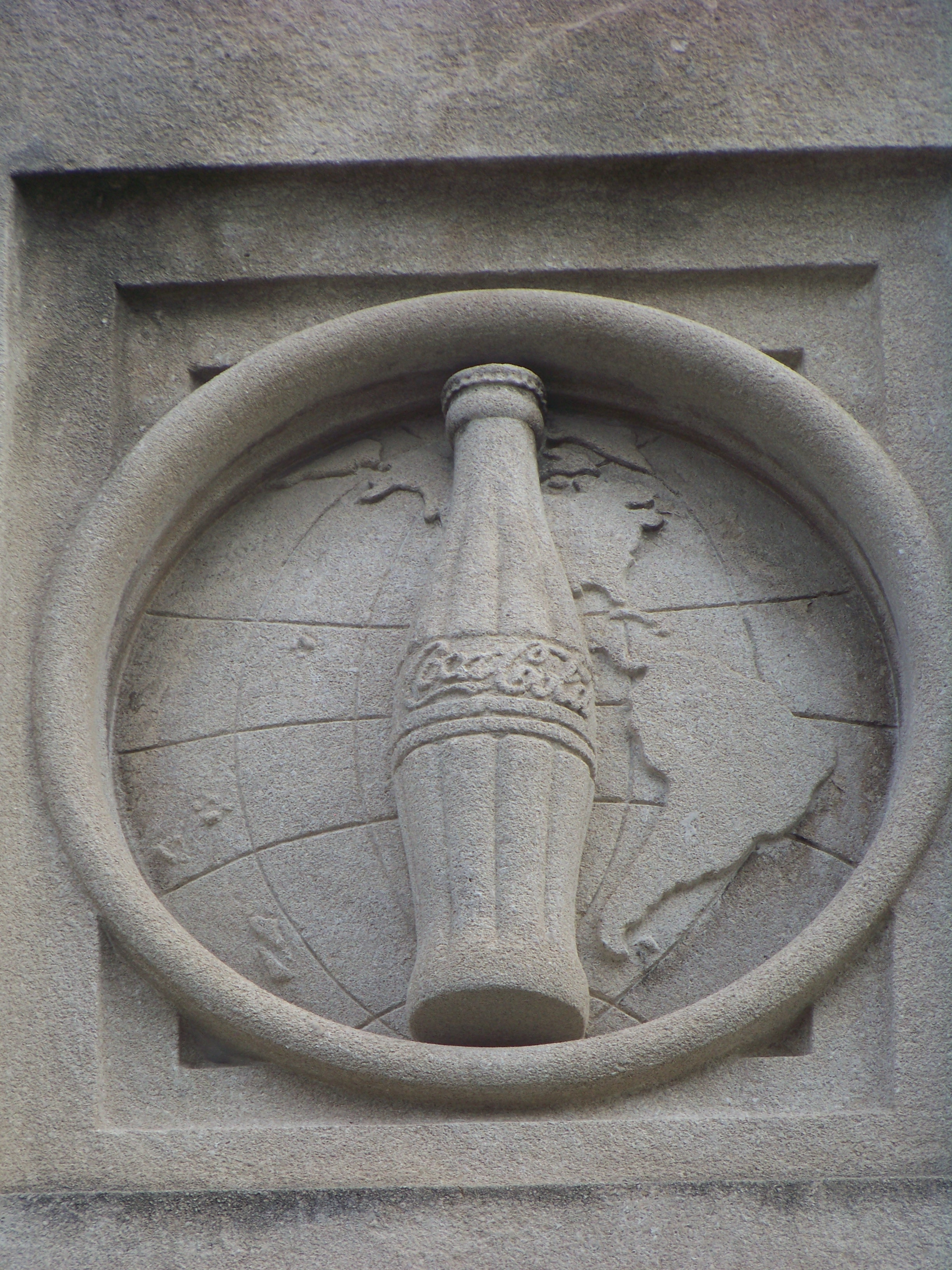
Detail above front door

== See also ==
- Coca-Cola Bottling Company Building (Columbia, Missouri)
- Coca-Cola Bottling Plant (Ocala, Florida)
