= Coca-Cola Bottling Company Building (Columbia, Missouri) =

- U.S. National Register of Historic Places
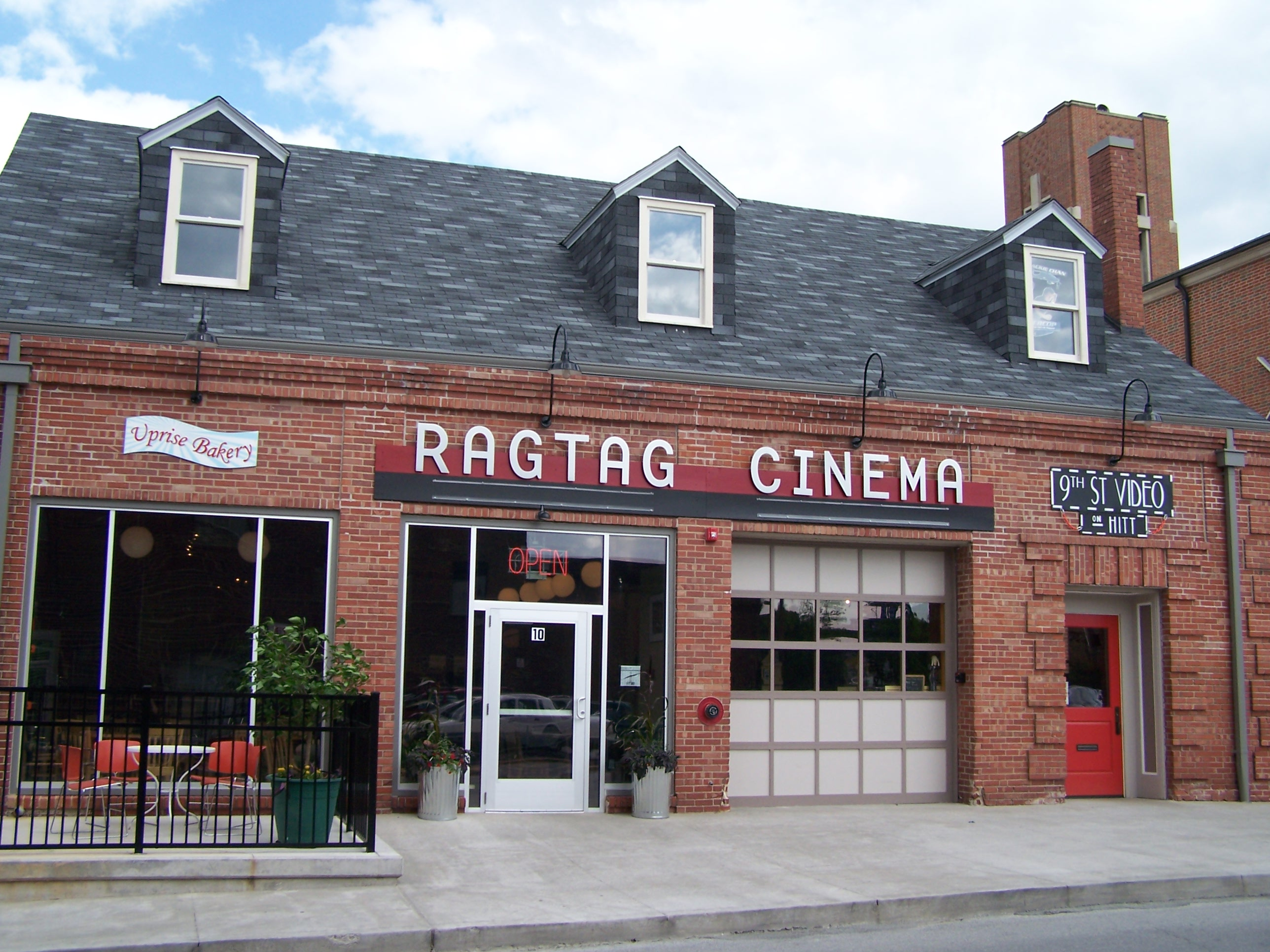

- Location within Missouri Location within the United States
- Location: 10 Hitt St., Columbia, Missouri
- Coordinates: 38°57′3″N 92°19′30″W
- Area: less than one acre
- Built: 1935
- Architectural style: Colonial Revival
- MPS: Downtown Columbia, Missouri MPS
- NRHP reference No.: 06000043
- Added to NRHP: February 14, 2006

The Coca-Cola Bottling Company Building, also known as the Kelly Press Building, is a historic commercial building located on Hitt Street in downtown Columbia, Missouri. It was built in 1935, and is a 1 1/2-story, Colonial Revival style brick building with a side gable roof with three dormers. It has a long one-story rear ell. Today it houses Uprise Bakery, Ragtag Cinema (an independent theatre and staple of Columbia's cultural scene), Ninth Street Video, and Hitt Records.

It was listed on the National Register of Historic Places in 2006.

== See also ==
- Coca-Cola Building (St. Louis)
- Coca-Cola Building (Kansas City, Missouri)
- List of Coca-Cola buildings and structures
- National Register of Historic Places listings in Boone County, Missouri
