= Coca-Cola Building (Chicago) =

- Coca-Cola Company Building
- U.S. National Register of Historic Places
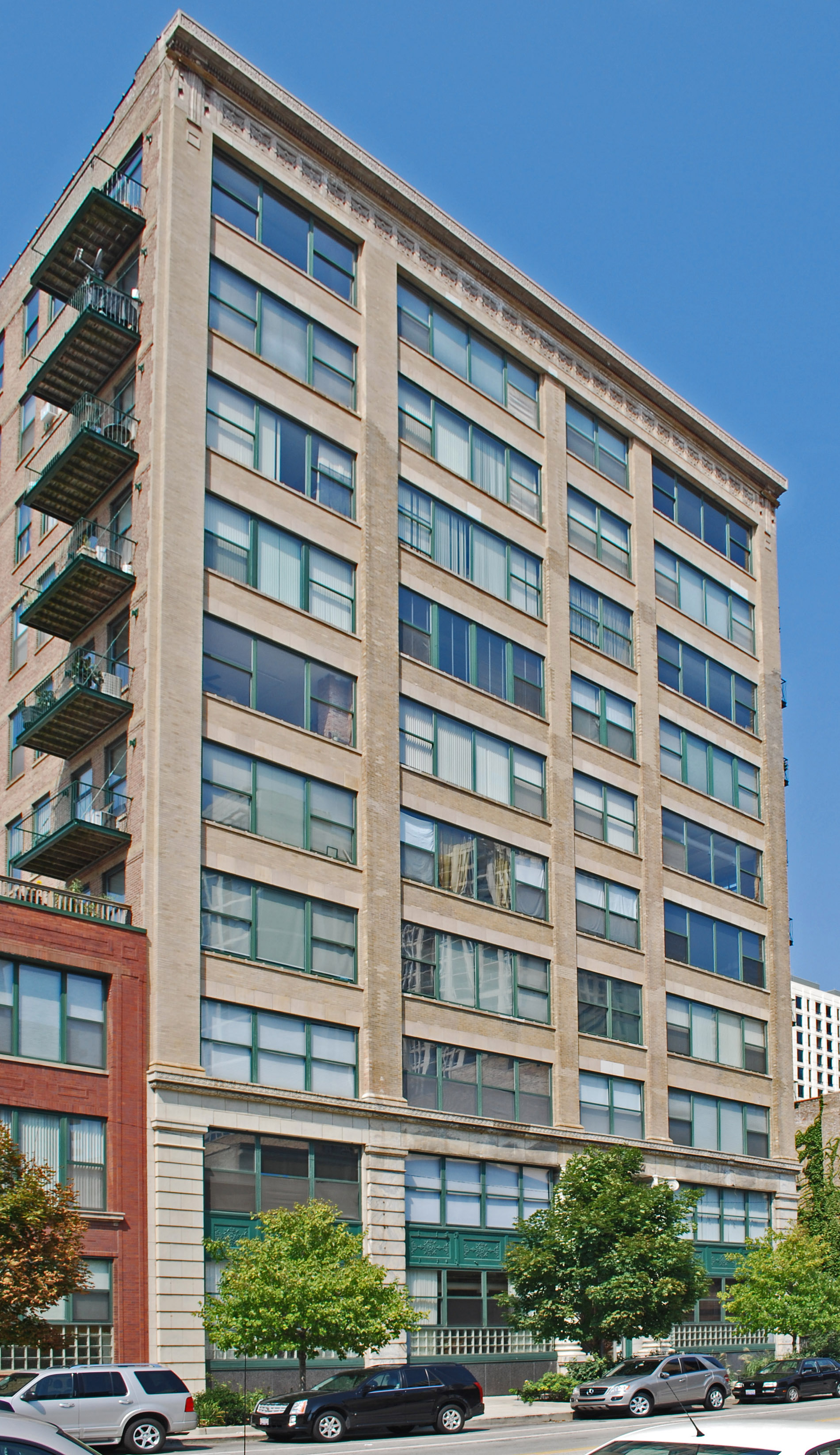

- Location within Chicago metropolitan area Location within Illinois Location within the United States
- Location: 1322--1336 S. Wabash Ave., Chicago, Illinois
- Coordinates: 41°51′54″N 87°37′34″W
- Area: less than one acre
- Built: 1904
- Architect: Abbott, Frank
- Architectural style: Chicago school
- NRHP reference No.: 91000114
- Added to NRHP: February 22, 1991

The Coca-Cola Building (also called the Coca-Cola Company Building) is a building located at 1322–1336 S. Wabash Ave. in the Near South Side community area of Chicago, Illinois, which once served as the Chicago headquarters of The Coca-Cola Company. The building was designed by Frank Abbott in the Commercial style and built from 1903 to 1904. When it opened, the building was eight stories high; two additional stories were added in 1913. The building features limestone with iron ornaments on its first two stories; a cornice with a terra cotta fretwork pattern at the top separates the second and third floors. The top of the building features a terra cotta frieze and a cornice with decorative patterns. The Coca-Cola Company operated out of the building from 1904 until 1928; the building was the company's second office outside of Atlanta. The building was the only Coca-Cola syrup manufacturing plant in the Midwest until 1915; it is now the only surviving Coca-Cola plant from before World War II outside of Atlanta.

The Coca-Cola Building was added to the National Register of Historic Places on February 22, 1991.

== See also ==
- Coca-Cola Bottling Company Building (Quincy, Illinois)
- List of Coca-Cola buildings and structures
- National Register of Historic Places listings in Central Chicago
