= Coca-Cola Bottling Plant (Trenton, Florida) =

Historic building in Trenton, Florida, US

Coordinates: 29.6167°N 82.8187°W

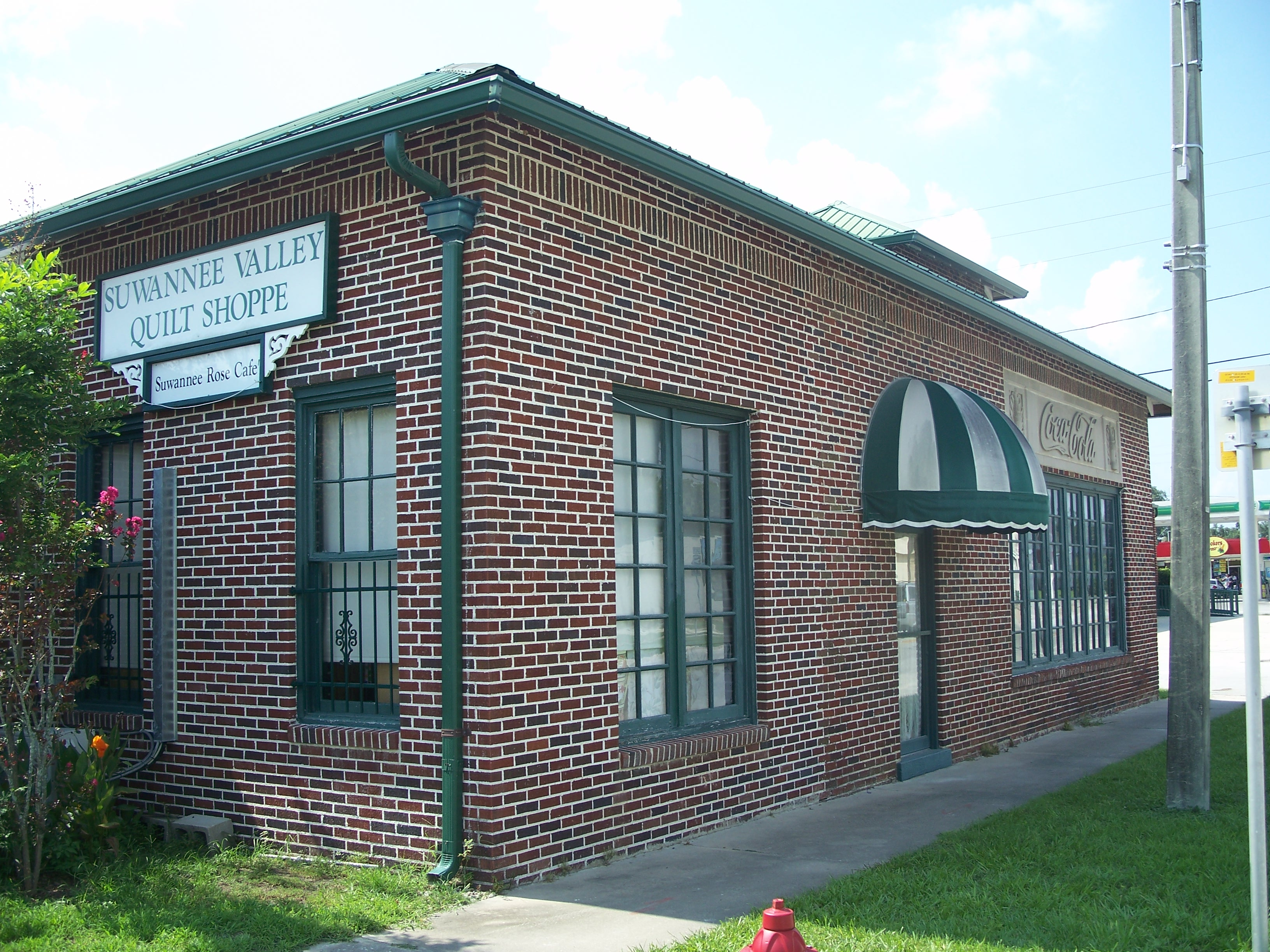

General information
- Architectural style: ?
- Location: 517 N Main St. Trenton, Florida, United States
- Completed: 1925, with later additions to the rear

Technical details
- Structural system: redbrick

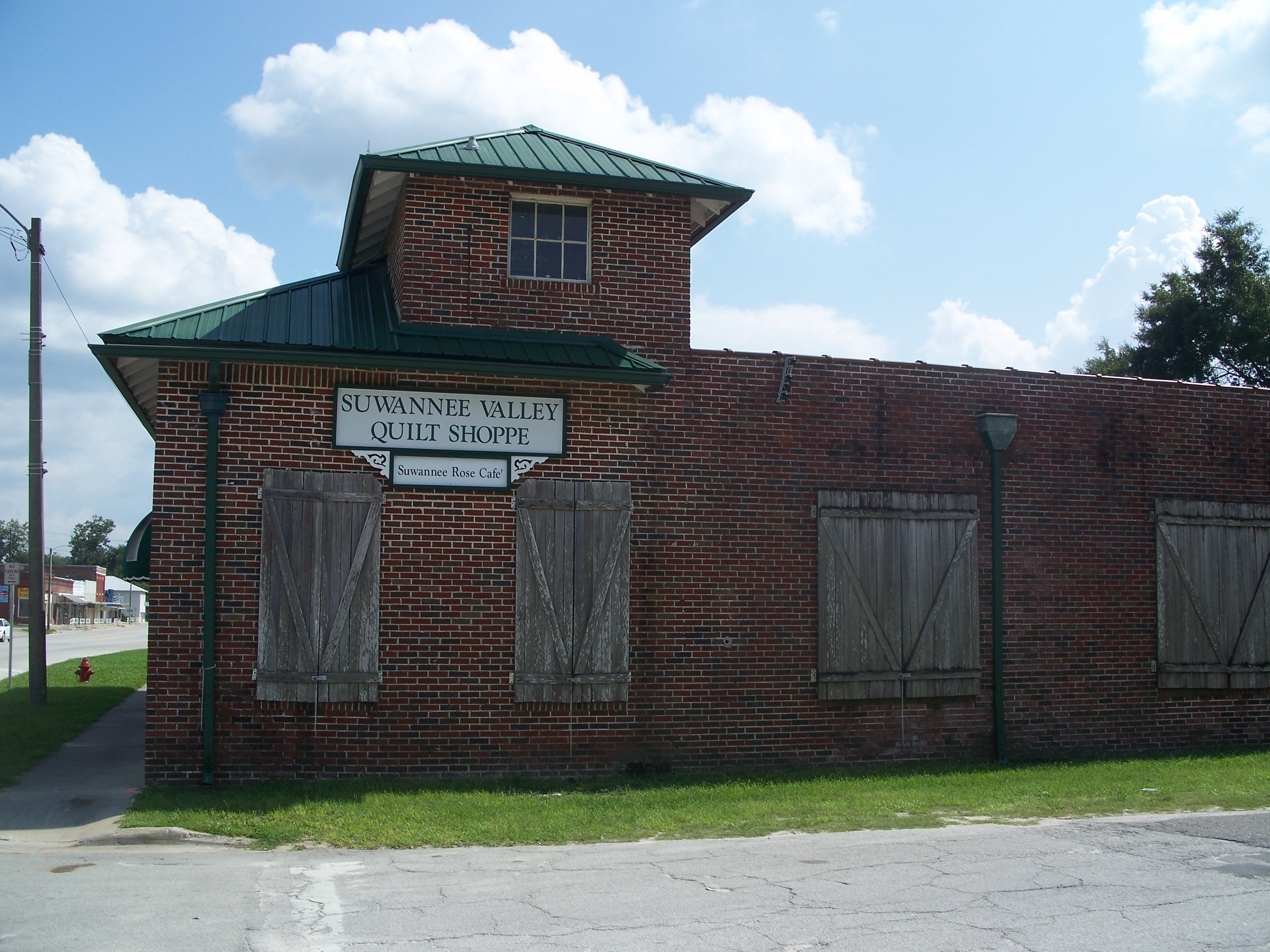

The Coca-Cola Bottling Plant (also known as the Coca-Cola Building and the Florida Coca-Cola Bottling Company) is an historic one-story redbrick building located at 517 North Main Street in Trenton, Gilchrist County, Florida. Built in 1925, the building was listed in 1989 in A Guide to Florida's Historic Architecture, published by the University of Florida Press. It is the first Coca-Cola bottling plant built in Florida. At the time of its listing, it was "in disrepair and not in use." Today it has been renovated and is being used by the Off The Beet Restaurant

== See also ==
- Coca-Cola Bottling Plant (Fort Lauderdale, Florida)
- Coca-Cola Bottling Plant (Ocala, Florida)
- List of Coca-Cola buildings and structures
