= Coca-Cola Baltimore Branch Factory =

- U.S. National Register of Historic Places
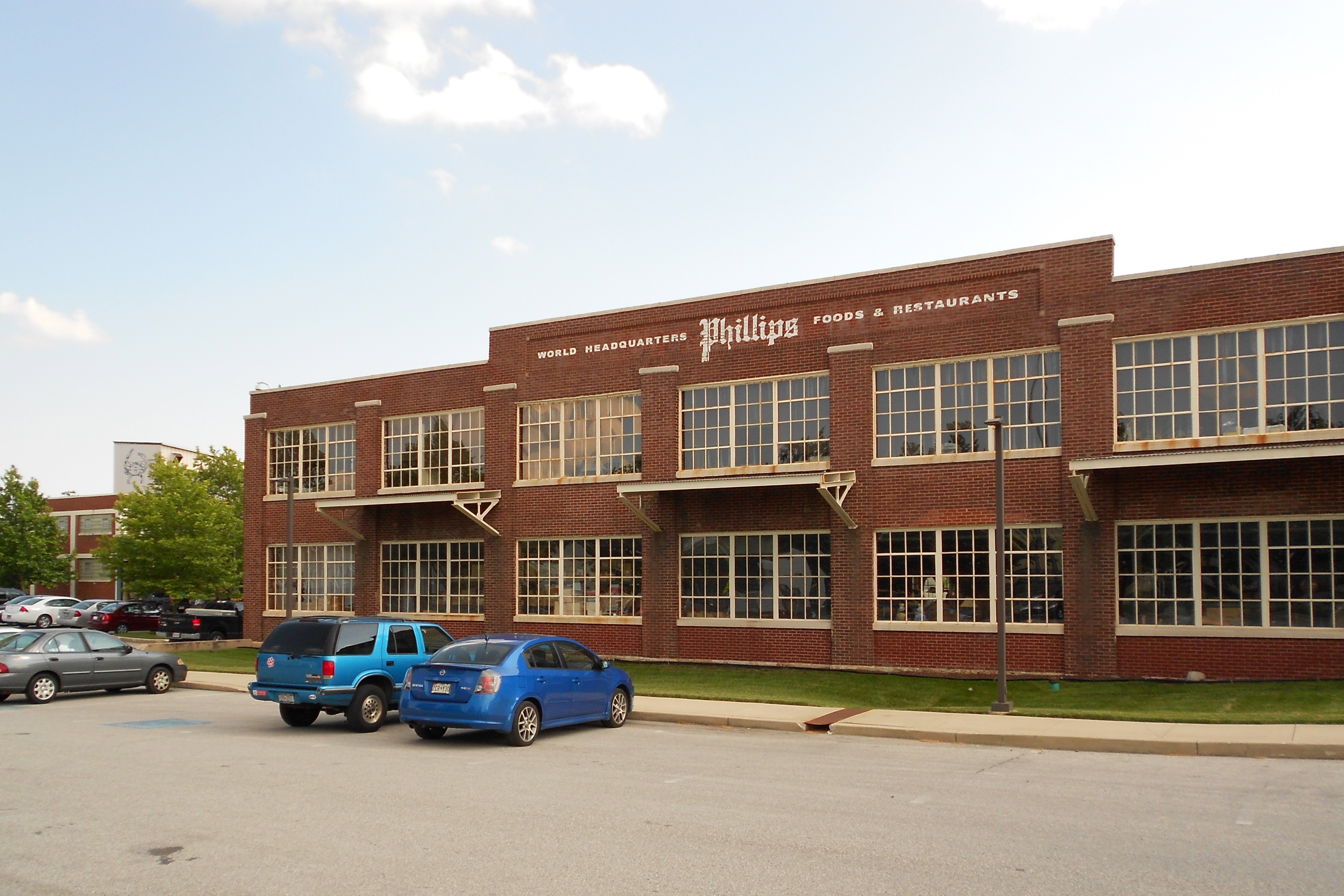
- Former Coca-Cola Baltimore Branch Factory, May 2012

- Location within Baltimore Location within Maryland Location within the United States
- Location: 1215 E. Fort Ave., Baltimore, Maryland
- Coordinates: 39°16′7″N 76°35′53″W
- Area: 9.4 acres (3.8 ha)
- Built: 1921
- Built by: Arthur C. Tufts & Co.
- Architect: Robert & Co. (1935 addition)
- NRHP reference No.: 01000407
- Added to NRHP: May 4, 2001

Coca-Cola Baltimore Branch Factory is a historic factory complex located at Baltimore, Maryland, United States. It was constructed from 1921 to 1948 and built principally to house Coca-Cola's syrup-making operations. The complex is spread over a 9.4-acre (38,000 m^{2}) site and includes a two-story brick syrup factory/sugar warehouse and an earlier two-story brick mattress factory (The Simmons Building) that Coca-Cola acquired and adapted in the 1930s. Completed in 1948, the complex housed syrup-making operations as well as the Coca-Cola Company's chemistry department.

Coca-Cola Baltimore Branch Factory was listed on the National Register of Historic Places in 2001.

== See also ==
- Coca-Cola Branch Factory (St. Louis)
- Coca-Cola Bottling Company of Baltimore Building
- List of Coca-Cola buildings and structures
- National Register of Historic Places listings in South and Southeast Baltimore
