= Candler Building (Atlanta) =

The Candler Hotel
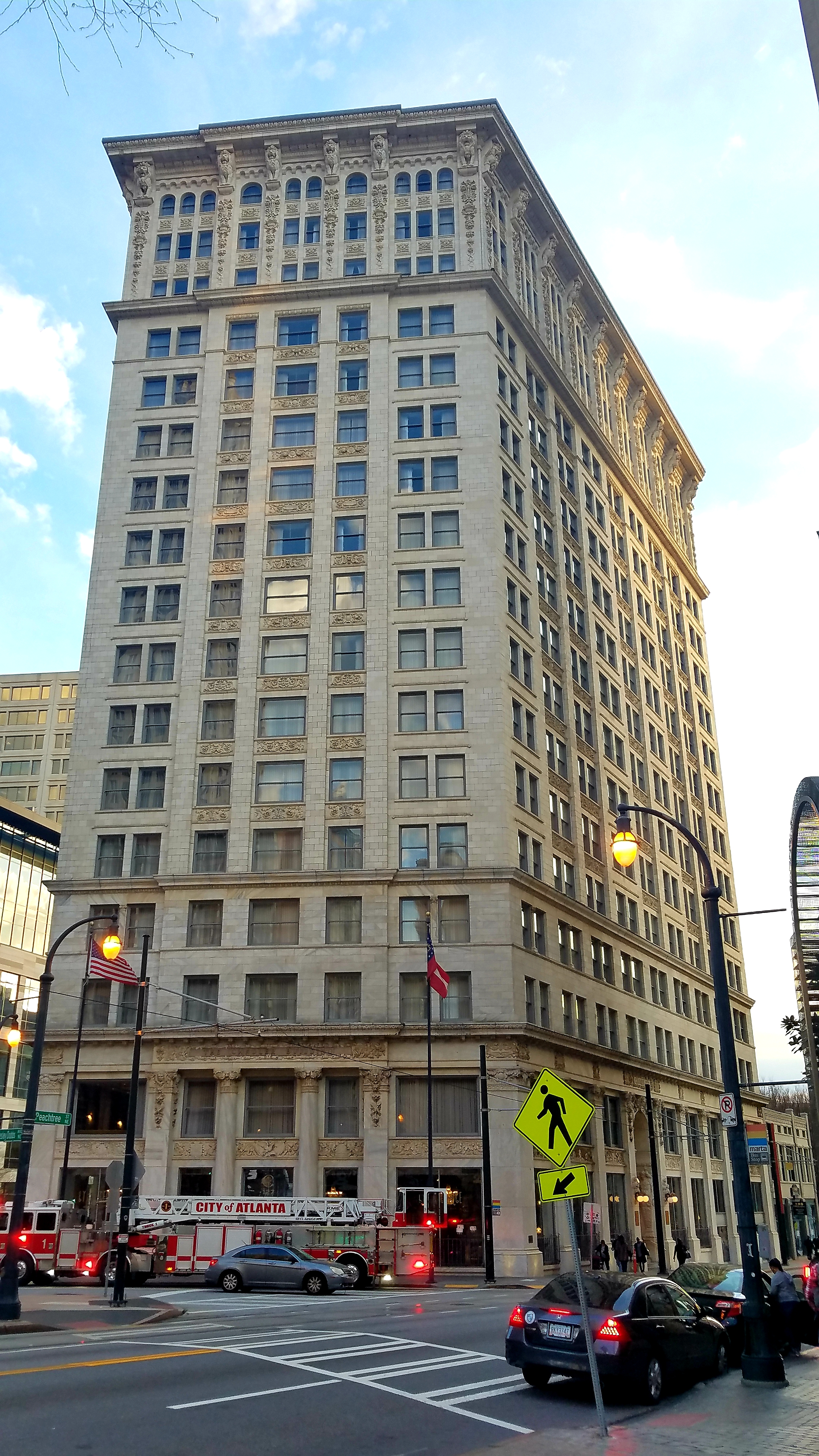
- Candler Building in 2020
- Interactive map of the The Candler Hotel area

General information
- Type: Hotel (formerly commercial offices)
- Location: 127 Peachtree Street NE; Atlanta, Georgia
- Coordinates: 33.75689°N 84.38788°W
- Construction started: 1904
- Completed: 1906
- Owner: REM Associates, L.P.

Height
- Roof: ~ 240 ft (73 m)

Technical details
- Floor count: 17

Design and construction
- Architects: George Stewart; George E. Murphy
- Structural engineer: American Bridge Company
- Candler Building
- U.S. National Register of Historic Places
- U.S. National Historic Landmark
- Atlanta Landmark Building
- Architectural style: Beaux-Arts; Neo-Renaissance
- NRHP reference No.: 77000424

Significant dates
- Designated NHL: August 24, 1977
- Designated ALB: October 23, 1989

The Candler Building is a 17-story high-rise at 127 Peachtree Street, NE, in Atlanta, Georgia. When completed in 1906 by Coca-Cola magnate Asa Griggs Candler, it was the tallest building in the city. This location where Houston (now John Wesley Dobbs Ave) joins Peachtree Street was the location of one of the earliest churches in the city which was built on land donated by Judge Reuben Cone in the 1840s. It forms the northern border of Woodruff Park.

Central Bank and Trust, the bank founded by Coca-Cola co-founder Asa Griggs Candler, had its headquarters in the building.

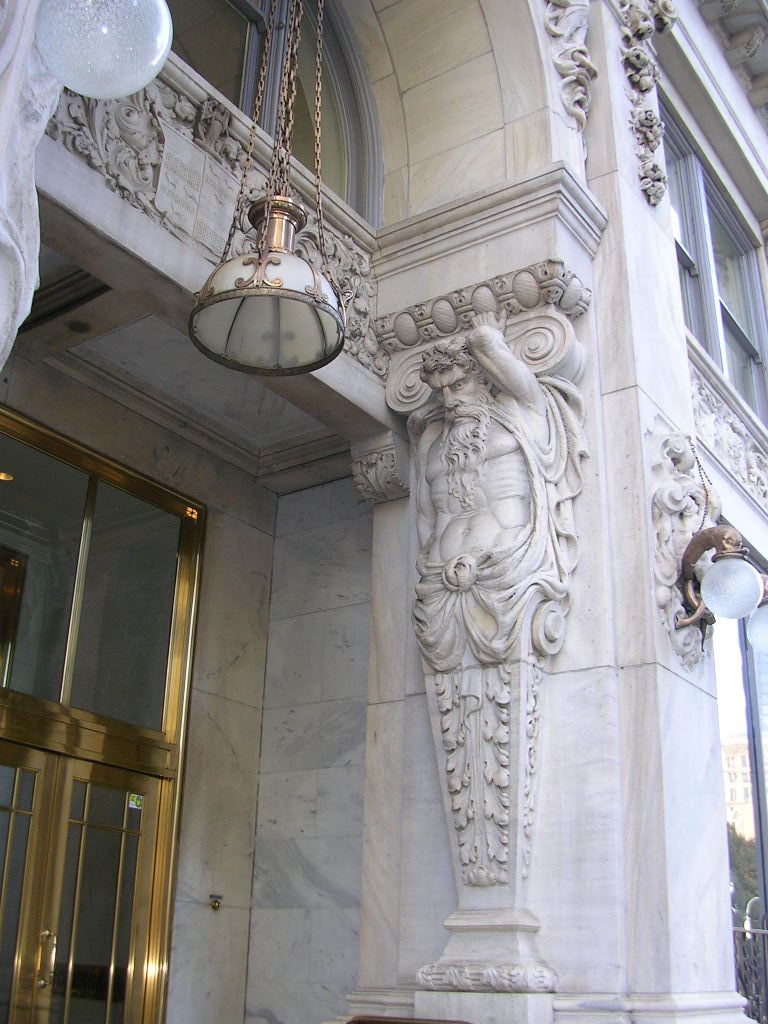

The Beaux-Arts details remain intact and the building is on the National Register of Historic Places. The cornerstone reads "Candler Investment Co. 1904 Geo. E. Murphy Architect".

The building was featured in the 2017 crime film Baby Driver, where it was the site of the first bank robbery committed in the film.

In 2016, the building's owner, REM Associates, L.P., announced plans to convert it to a luxury boutique hotel. The Candler Hotel, Curio Collection by Hilton opened on October 24, 2019. The 265-room hotel retains the building's iconic lobby, with a restaurant named By George in the former Central Bank and Trust location, and 6,000 square feet (560 m^{2}) of meeting space. The hotel was also inducted into Historic Hotels of America, the official program of the National Trust for Historic Preservation, that same year.

== See also ==
- National Register of Historic Places listings in Fulton County, Georgia
- Hotels in Atlanta
- Candler Building (Kansas City)
- Candler Building (New York City)
- Candler Field
- Candler Park
