= Coca-Cola Bottling Company Building (Quincy, Illinois) =

- U.S. National Register of Historic Places
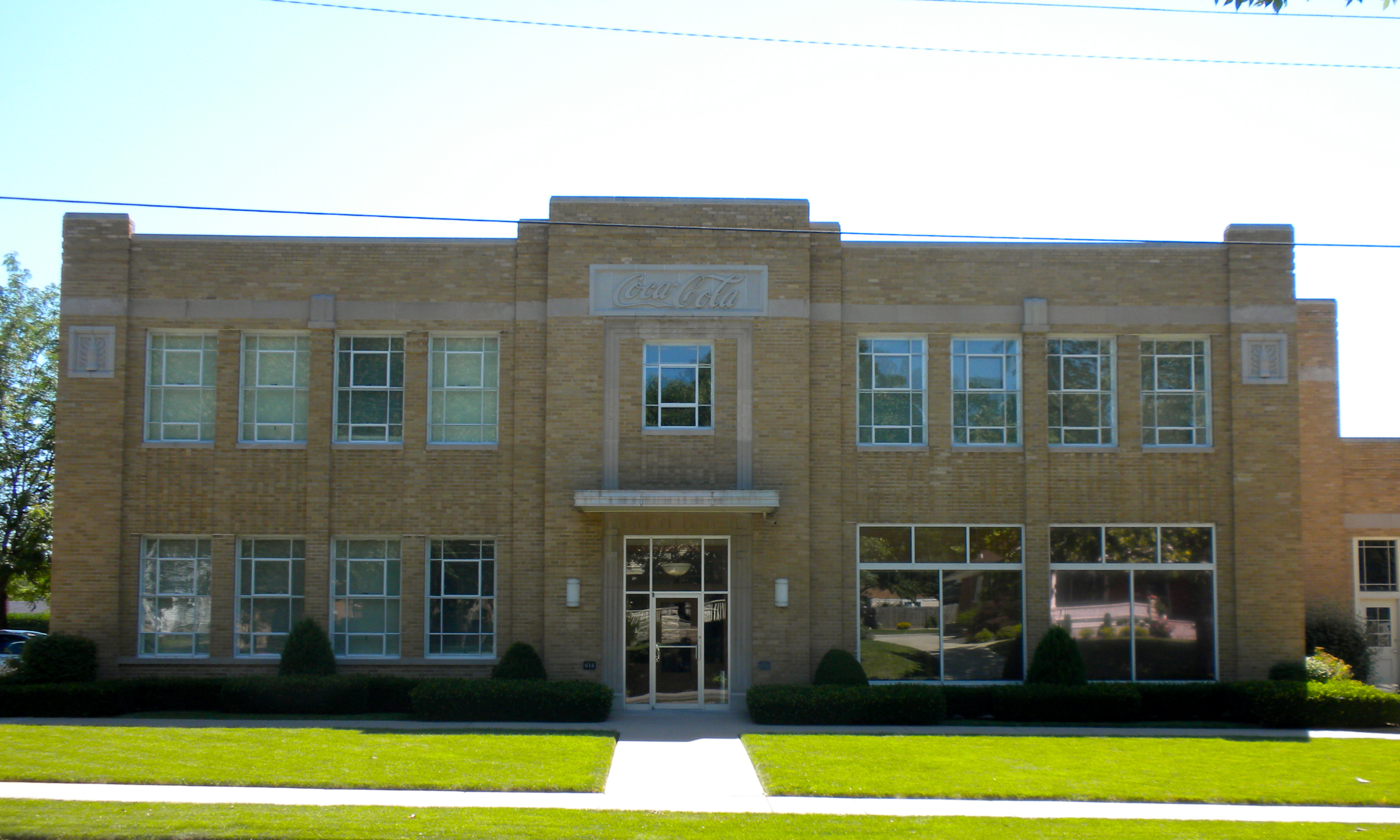

- Location within Illinois Location within the United States
- Location: 616 N. 24th St., Quincy, Illinois
- Coordinates: 39°56′18″N 91°22′37″W
- Area: 1.6 acres (0.65 ha)
- Built: 1940
- Architect: Geise, Martin J.; Shelton, Jesse
- Architectural style: Art Deco
- NRHP reference No.: 97000032
- Added to NRHP: February 7, 1997

The Coca-Cola Bottling Company Building is a historic Coca-Cola bottling plant located at 616 North 24th Street in Quincy, Illinois. The building was constructed in 1940 for the J. J. Flynn Co., Coca-Cola's regional bottling company in Quincy and one of six Coca-Cola bottlers in Illinois. Local architect Martin J. Geise designed the Art Deco building, one of the few examples of Art Deco in an industrial building in Quincy. The building's design features a projecting central entrance with a high roof line, pilasters with terra cotta decorations at the front corners, and brick columns dividing the front windows; the features combine to give the building a strong vertical emphasis, an important Art Deco aesthetic. Some features of the emerging Art Moderne style are present in the building, including a stone string course, a flat overhang covering the entrance, and a flat roof.

The building was added to the National Register of Historic Places on February 7, 1997.

== See also ==
- Coca-Cola Building (Chicago)
- List of Coca-Cola buildings and structures
- National Register of Historic Places listings in Adams County, Illinois
