= Sigal Music Museum =

Musical instrument museum in South Carolina, United States

- Former name: Carolina Music Museum
- Established: 2017
- Location: Greenville, South Carolina
- Coordinates: 34.8565°N 82.4028°W
- Type: Music instrument museum
- Website: sigalmusicmuseum.org

The Sigal Music Museum (formerly known as the Carolina Music Museum) is a musical instrument museum in Greenville, South Carolina, United States at Heritage Green.

The museum was founded in 2017 by keyboard collectors Tom and Deborah Strange, with Steven Bichel and Beth Marr Lee. Opened to the public in 2018, it resides in a former bottling plant of the Coca-Cola Bottling Company, built in 1930. The museum is located at the only remaining part of the plant which is the front section. The name change came in 2020 after instrument collector Marlowe Sigal's family donated his private collection of instruments to the museum, valued at $3.1 million, after his death.

Among the collection is a 1761 Jacob Kirkman harpsichord owned by Queen Charlotte that was played by Wolfgang Amadeus Mozart, then aged eight, while his family was in London during their grand tour and an 1845 John Broadwood & Sons grand piano, played by Frédéric Chopin in May 1848 during his tour of Great Britain.

== See also ==
- The Kazoo Museum: Beaufort, South Carolina
- List of Coca-Cola buildings and structures
