= Coca-Cola Syrup Plant =

Historic factory building in St. Louis

- U.S. National Register of Historic Places
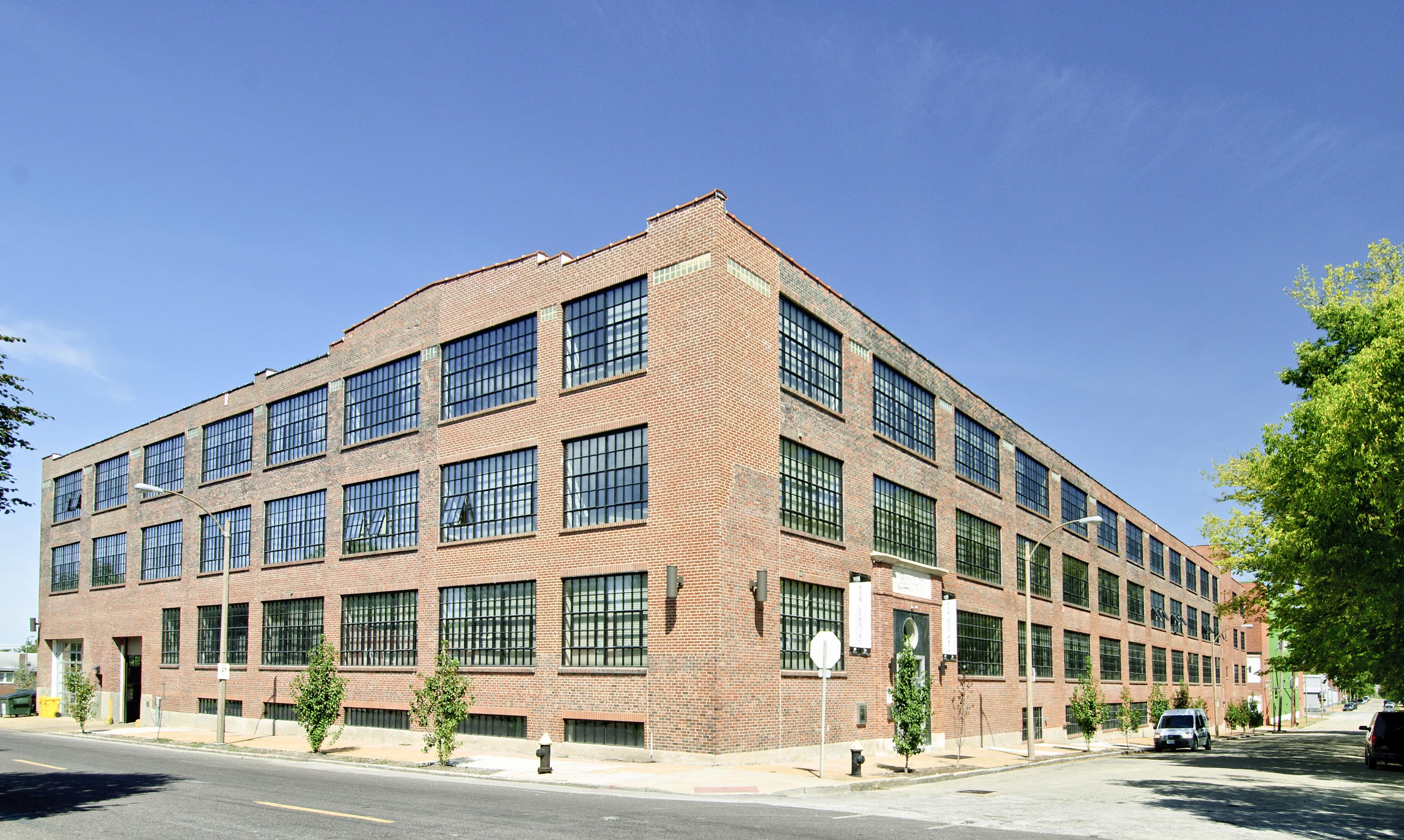
- The building in 2012

- Location within St. Louis Location within Missouri Location within the United States
- Location: 8125 Michigan Avenue, St. Louis, Missouri 63111
- Coordinates: 38°32′45″N 90°15′57″W
- Built: 1920
- Architect: Harry G. Clymer
- Architectural style: Art Deco
- Restored by: ebsersoldt+associates architecture (E+A)
- Website: www.facebook.com/temtorlofts/
- NRHP reference No.: 08000359
- Added to NRHP: April 30, 2008

The Coca-Cola Syrup Plant is a former industrial building in St. Louis, Missouri that made soft drink concentrate for the Coca-Cola company. The National Register of Historic Places listed the structure which has since been converted to the residential Temtor Lofts.

== History ==
Milton G. Clymer founded the Best-Clymer Manufacturing Company in 1913 to make preserves. In 1915 a major competitor, the Corn Products Refining Company, had to be broken up due to the Supreme Court finding that it was an illegal trust. In 1919, Clymer purchased assets from the trust and combined it with his earlier company to form the Temtor Fruit & Products Company. That larger company required a new factory, so Clymer hired his cousin, architect Harry G. Clymer, to design the building.

The factory was completed in 1920 with a spur from the nearby Missouri Pacific Railroad and located in the industrial Carondelet area of St. Louis. In 1928, Temtor encountered financial problems so the Preserves and Honey, Inc. purchased the facility and created a subsidiary called Michigan-Davis to run it. In turn, Michigan-Davis sold the factory to Coca-Cola in 1937 to convert it into a syrup plant.

Before then, the nearest syrup plant was in Chicago and company president Robert W. Woodruff wanted an additional source for the Midwest. Coca-Cola syrup plants are directly owned and controlled out of the headquarters in Atlanta to ensure the secret formula is not disclosed. In contrast, Coca-Cola bottling plants are relatively common independent franchisees who receive deliveries from a syrup plant. After five decades, Coca-Cola closed the plant in 1988.

In 2011, the building was converted into a mixed-use development called Temtor Lofts with 77 housing units. The project received brownfield grants for asbestos and lead abatement. A microbrewery and restaurant, Perennial Artisan Ales, moved into the first floor.

== Architecture ==
The four-story building is C-shaped with an industrial Art Deco architecture. The exterior walls are brick with bays created by piers with a fenestration pattern consisting of sets of three windows. The top of the walls has terra cotta coping with a small parapet. Above the front door is a transom window and the "Coca-Cola" logo etched into a limestone panel.

The interior of the building is dominated by concrete mushroom columns. The basement originally contained large tanks for syrup storage.

== See also ==
- Seven-Up Headquarters
- Coca-Cola Syrup Plant (Baltimore)
- List of Coca-Cola buildings and structures
- National Register of Historic Places listings in St. Louis south and west of downtown
