= Western Auto Building =

Historic building in Kansas City, Missouri

- U.S. National Register of Historic Places
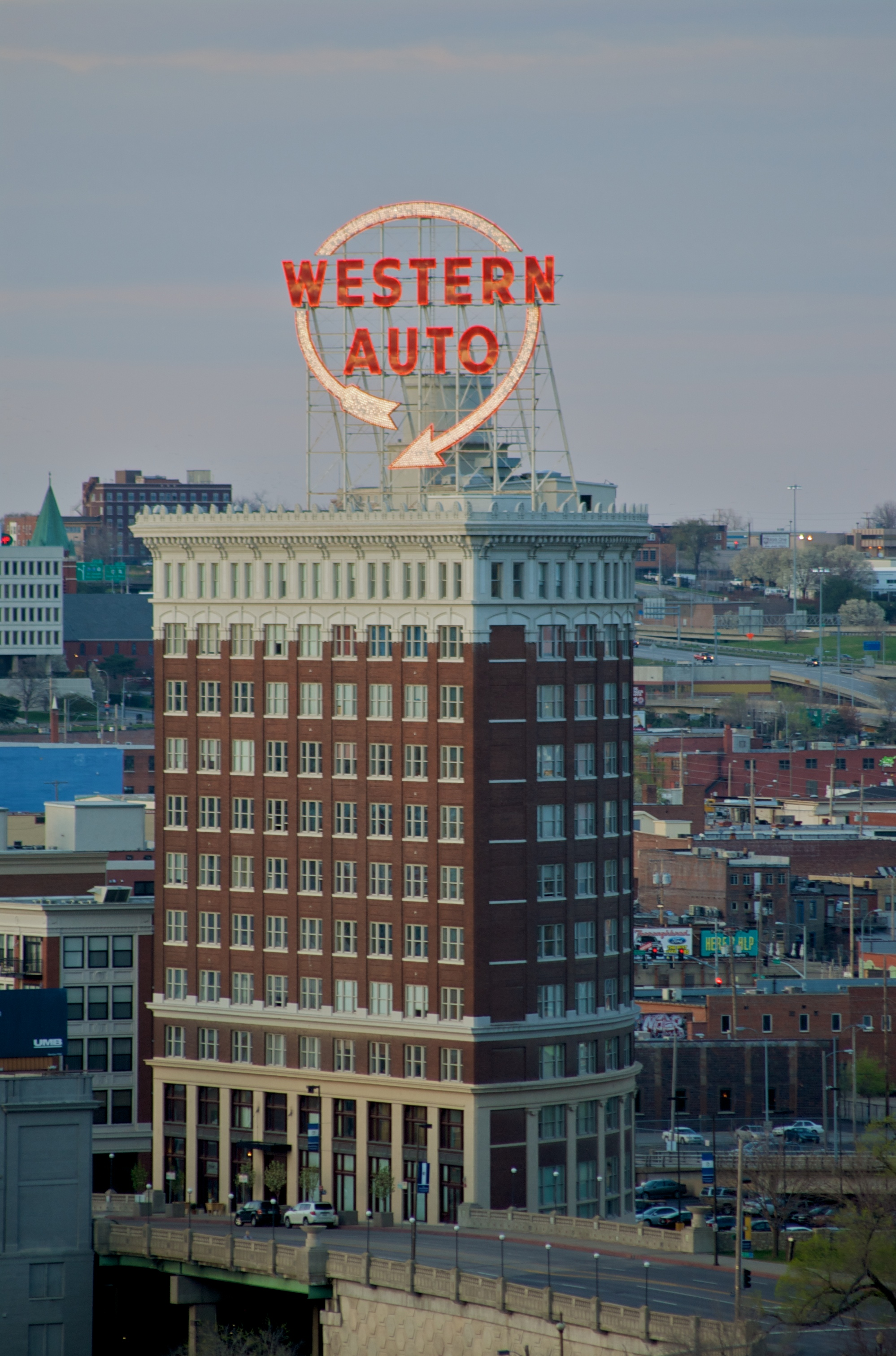
- Location: 2107 Grand Boulevard., Kansas City, Missouri
- Coordinates: 39°5′16″N 94°34′52″W
- Built: 1914; 112 years ago
- Architects: Arthur C. Tufts & Company
- Architectural style: Chicago school (Commercial)
- NRHP reference No.: 88001300
- Added to NRHP: August 18, 1988

The Western Auto Building, first known as the Coca-Cola Building or the Candler Building, after owner Asa Griggs Candler, is located at 2107 Grand Boulevard, in the Crossroads neighborhood of Kansas City, Missouri. Built in 1914, it later served as the headquarters of the Western Auto Supply Company and became known by that association, especially when the company put a multi-story lighted sign on top of the building.

The building was added to the National Register of Historic Places in 1988. After serving as office space, it was redeveloped in the early 21st century as part of Western Auto Lofts, a condominium association incorporating three adjacent buildings.

== History ==
The twelve-story building was designed by Arthur C. Tufts & Co. and built in 1914 by the Swenson Construction Company, for the Coca-Cola Company. Asa Griggs Candler had bought the recipe for the drink in 1892, founded the company and rapidly expanded distribution of the product. He established new bases in the South and Midwest, and began to sell the soda drink in Cuba. First known as the Coca-Cola Building or Candler Building, this was one of several he had built through Coca-Cola. Candler's company headquarters occupied the elaborate Candler Building in Atlanta.

This plot of land, originally purchased in 1913, is triangular, and the architect reflected that shape in his design for the 12-story building. It was built in the commercial style, a more utilitarian style than was typical of contemporary architecture.

It later was used as the headquarters of the Western Auto Supply Company. Its multi-story lighted sign tops the building. The building and its sign are visible from much of the Crossroads and the surrounding neighborhoods, and from Interstate 35. This visibility, together with the structure's longevity, has made the Western Auto Building a city landmark. The sign was relit on July 13, 2018, at 8:45 pm Central time, having been refurbished with funding from the condominium association.

The building was added to the National Register of Historic Places in 1988. It has been adapted as a residential loft condominium.

== See also ==
- List of Coca-Cola buildings and structures
- National Register of Historic Places listings in Jackson County, Missouri: Downtown Kansas City
