= Coca-Cola Olympic City =

Plaza in Atlanta, Georgia, US

Coordinates: 33.7634441°N 84.3940544°W

Coca-Cola Olympic City was an 8-acre (32,000 m^{2}) plaza in downtown Atlanta, Georgia, adjacent to the city's Centennial Olympic Park. It was built in concurrence with the 1996 Centennial Olympic Games in Atlanta. Managed by Orlando-based Baker Leisure Group, it featured three areas that displayed virtual reality Olympic sports attractions.

The first area allowed patrons to play a H-O-R-S-E style game called "HOOPS" against Grant Hill. The area also allowed patrons to test their baseball skills by striking out Cecil Fielder in a pitching simulator or hitting a home run against Tom Glavine in a batting simulator.

The second area allowed patrons to ride mountain bikes on simulated competition course, race against Jackie Joyner-Kersee in a 40-yard (37 m) dash, perform gymnastics on a balance beam with Mary Lou Retton, and race in a simulated wheelchair race as a Paralympian.

The third area included an Olympic themed theater show which took patrons through a 15-minute story about the history of the Olympic Games and the spirit of the Games. The area also featured actual Olympic artifacts from the Olympic Museum in Lausanne, Switzerland.

Other areas of Coca-Cola Olympic City included the Champions Challenge Obstacle Course and an open-air theater that feature live shows for the Coca-Cola Olympic City Kids.

== Post-Olympics developments ==
The area was left vacant after the plaza's closure. In 2002, the Coca-Cola Company donated 9 of its 20 acres (81,000 m^{2}) of property at the site to the Marcus Foundation for use as the site of the new Georgia Aquarium, which opened in November 2005. The company also made plans to construct its new World of Coca-Cola on the remainder of the property; the attraction opened in May 2007. The area was christened Pemberton Place after John Pemberton, inventor of Coca-Cola and dedicated to the people of Atlanta.
