= Coca-Cola Bottling Plant (Fort Lauderdale, Florida) =

Historic building in Fort Lauderdale, Florida, USA

Coordinates: 26.1132°N 80.1430°W

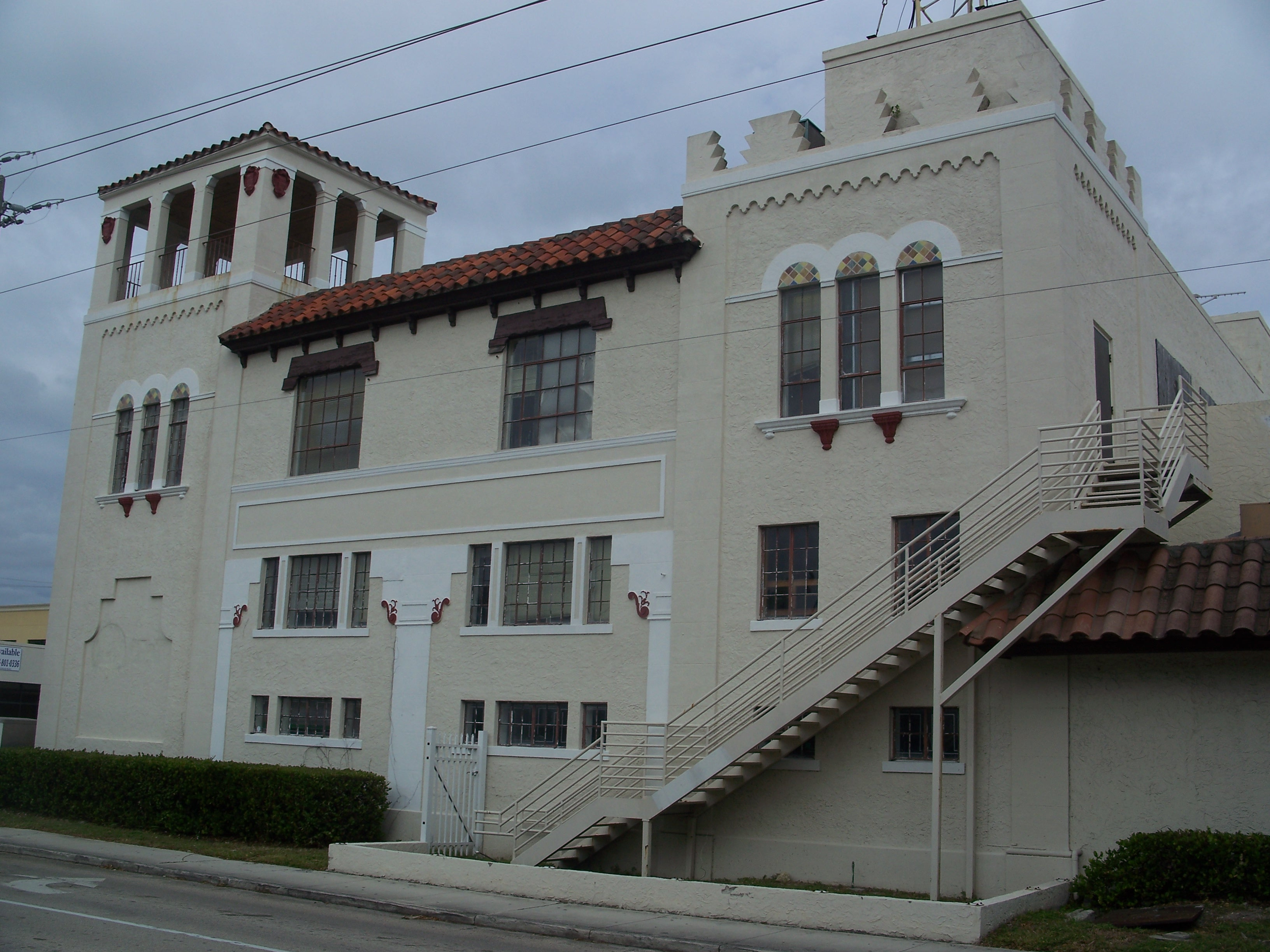
- Interactive map of the Coca-Cola Bottling Plant area

General information
- Architectural style: Mission/Spanish Revival
- Location: 644 South Andrews Avenue; Fort Lauderdale, Florida, United States
- Completed: 1938

Design and construction
- Architect: Courtney Stewart

The Coca-Cola Bottling Plant (also known as the Florida Coca-Cola Bottling Company) is an historic building located at 644 South Andrews Avenue at the corner of Southeast 7th Street in Fort Lauderdale, Florida, United States.

Built in 1938, it was designed by Fort Lauderdale architect Courtney Stewart in the Mission/Spanish Revival style of architecture. It is listed in the historic preservation unit of the city's comprehensive plan and is also listed on the Broward Trust for Historic Preservation's Significant and Endangered Sites in Broward County, Florida.

The building was in 2011 proposed to be converted into a parking garage.

A 1,000-car garage was erected encircling the building in 2014.

== See also ==
- Coca-Cola Bottling Plant (Ocala, Florida)
- Coca-Cola Bottling Plant (Trenton, Florida)
- List of Coca-Cola buildings and structures
