= Ragtag Cinema =

Coordinates: 38.950775°N 92.325299°W

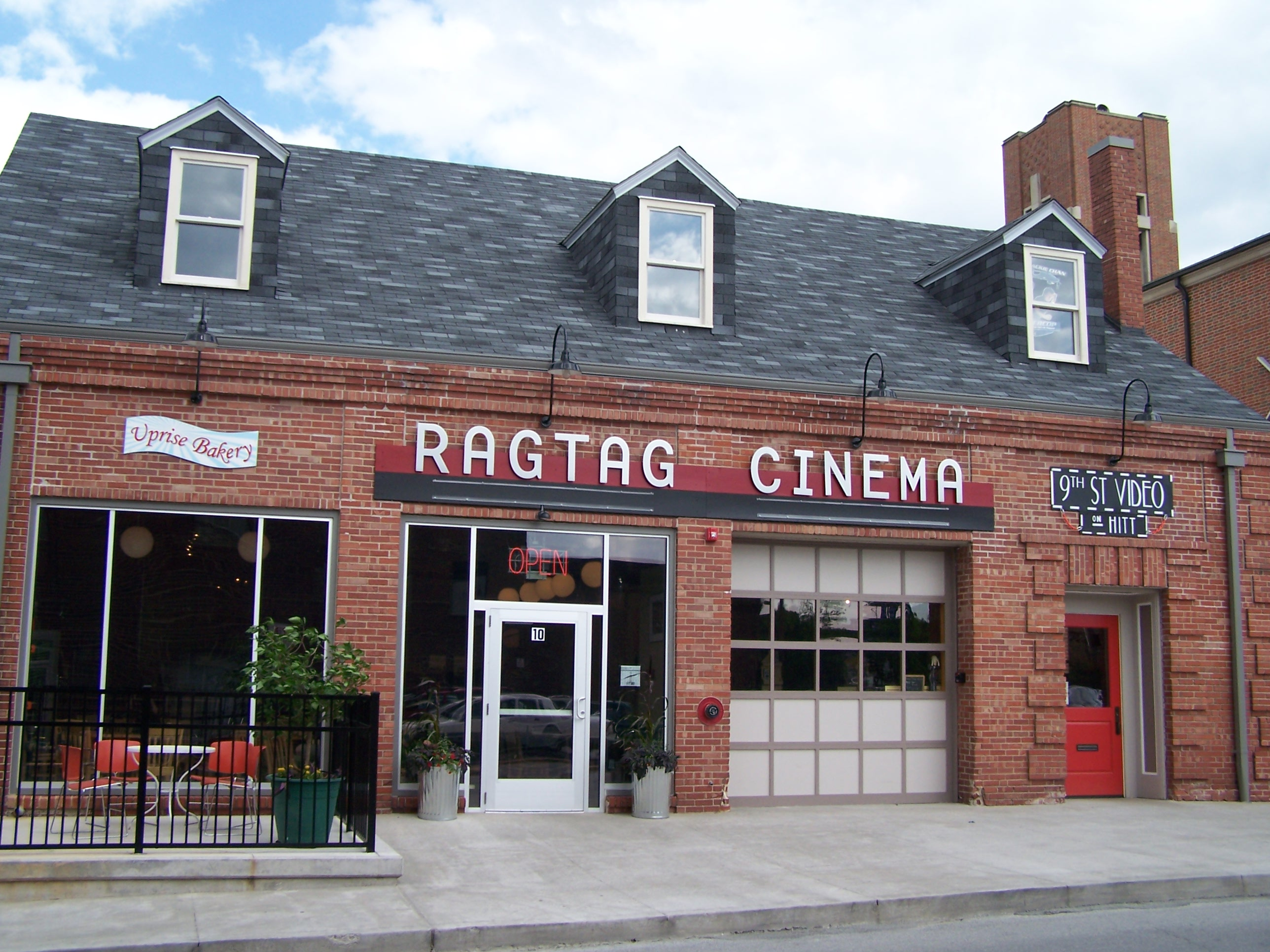
The Ragtag Cinema

Ragtag Cinema is a non-profit independent movie theater located on Hitt Street in Columbia, Missouri. The theater was founded by a group including Paul Sturtz and David Wilson in May 2000. The theater is the home of the Ragtag Film Society, a nonprofit organization which strives to champion film and other media arts to stimulate and encourage the culture of the community. It does so by spotlighting film as an art form, promoting media literacy, education and new ideas as well as supporting local artists. The theater also serves as a primary venue for the True/False Film Fest, which was launched by Sturtz and Wilson in 2004.

The first location, in a small storefront on 10th Street, featured couches and chairs to accommodate up to 75 guests for its one screen. The theater moved to its present location a few blocks away in 2009. Several other small businesses are housed at the same address, including Uprise Bakery and Hitt Records.

== History ==
The Ragtag Film Society formed in January 1998, with the goal of presenting a series of films in downtown Columbia, which would not otherwise be shown. Richard King (of The Blue Note), Janet Marsh and Sally Beattie (9th St. Video) and Sam Black provided the necessary aid to make it initially possible. According to the founders, the name of the society was suggested when, at an early meeting in Columbia's Peace Park, an eavesdropping park official walked by and uttered a dismissive "Sounds like a ragtag operation to me!"

The organization began with no experience in the film business and little technical knowledge but received sufficient community support to continue the film series for more than the initial few weeks. Consistent attendance, grass-roots support, and a rotating staff of volunteers helped keep the screenings going for several seasons.

After some fundraising efforts including a benefit screening of Alfred Hitchcock's Rear Window, at the Missouri Theater, the society was able to acquire a 35mm projector. After being approached by Tim Spence, Holly Roberson, and Ron Rottinghaus, they agreed to move the operation into a space that they would build. In the International Order of Odd Fellows building on Tenth Street in May 2000, a café/movie theater/film scene clubhouse called The Ragtag Cinemacafé opened its doors to the public. The first screening, in May 2000, was a popular movie about Missouri, Waiting for Guffman.

The theater relocated in 2009 to a new 10,000 square-foot location on Hitt Street. The redesign of the building was done by local architect Brian Pape and provides more theater capacity and more efficient use of space for the combined enterprises within. One theater room (130 seats) features traditional theater seating, while the other (70 seats) is a loose re-creation of the theater at the old location with seating composed of couches and vintage chairs. With construction completed in the Spring of '08, the building now houses Uprise Bakery and full bar, Ragtag Cinema, and Hitt Records on Hitt in one location. The building is on the National Register of Historic Places.

== Film selection ==
The Ragtag Cinema produces a monthly calendar which consists of an average of 12 events/movies per month. The cinema strives to bring a mix of films that reflect its audience's diversity. The cinema reads reviews, opinions and the choices of its brethren at the country's microcinemas, film societies, and other theaters to inform its decision on which films to select for a given month.

== Sources ==
- O’Brien, Dianna Borsi (2021). Historic Movie Theaters of Columbia Missouri. Charleston, South Carolina: The History Press (Arcadia Publishing). pp. 152–157. ISBN 9781467146401.
