= Reuben Cone =

American pioneer and landowner

Judge Reuben Cone (July 14, 1788 – April 10, 1851) was an important pioneer and landowner in Atlanta, Georgia.

He was an early pioneer in DeKalb County, Georgia where he married Lucinda Shumate (1796–1872) and served on an education committee in 1823. He began serving as a justice of the inferior court there in February 1825. This was at a time when Decatur consisted of a dozen log cabins.

== Land Lot 78 ==
This important section of 202½ acres includes all of the current Fairlie-Poplar district and Centennial Olympic Park was originally granted to a Jane Doss of Jackson County, Georgia who sold it a year later, in 1826 to Matthew Henry of Gwinnett for $50. Henry held onto it for twelve years and sold it to Judge Cone for $300.

The spike that Stephen Harriman Long drove into the ground to mark the terminus of the Western and Atlantic Railroad lay within Judge Cone's Land Lot 78, an event which led to the foundation of the city of Atlanta. When selling off his large land holdings, he would divvy up small lots and sell them for low prices to encourage more people to settle in the young town.

== Other works ==
Also in 1848, Judge Cone donated a section of his land along Marietta street for the First Presbyterian church (this lot is now part of the State Bar of Georgia building) which was completed by Richard Peters in 1852. He is buried at Oakland Cemetery and remembered by the naming of Cone Street in downtown Atlanta.
