= Coca-Cola Bottling Plant (Ocala, Florida) =

- U.S. National Register of Historic Places
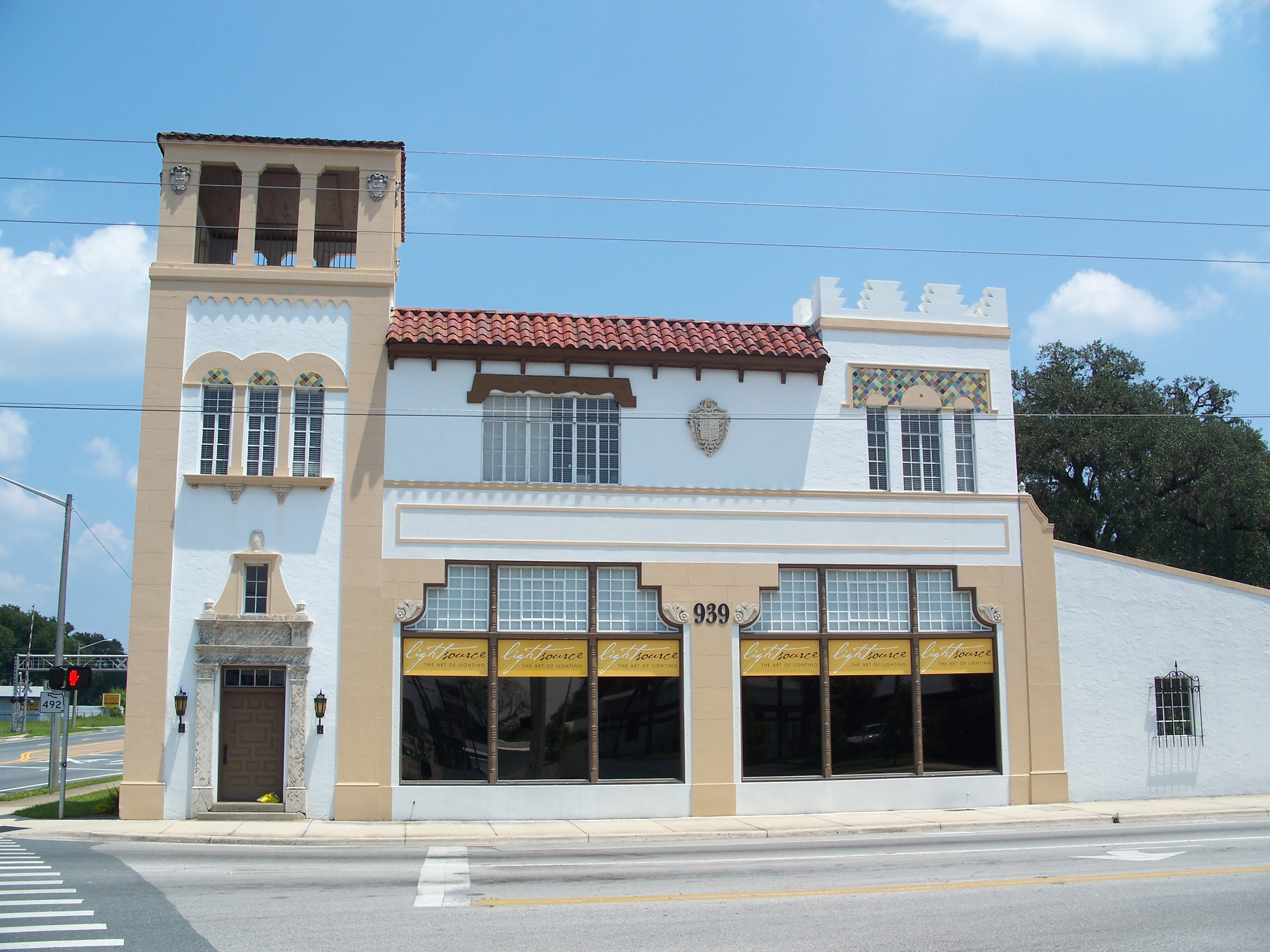

- Location within Florida Location within the United States
- Location: 939 N. Magnolia Ave., Ocala, Florida
- Coordinates: 29°11′47″N 82°8′11″W
- Area: less than 1 acre (0.40 ha)
- Built: 1939
- Architect: Courtney Stewart; Alexander Martin
- Architectural style: Mission/Spanish Revival
- NRHP reference No.: 79000682
- Added to NRHP: May 4, 1979

The Coca-Cola Bottling Plant (also known as the Florida Coca-Cola Bottling Company) is an historic building located at 939 North Magnolia Avenue in Ocala, Florida, United States. Built in 1939, it was designed by Fort Lauderdale architect Courtney Stewart in the Mission/Spanish Revival style of architecture. On May 4, 1979, it was added to the U.S. National Register of Historic Places. Now owned and operated by Gartner Group, Inc. The building is the site of Grand Pointe Ocala, the cities premier event and conference center.

== Gallery ==
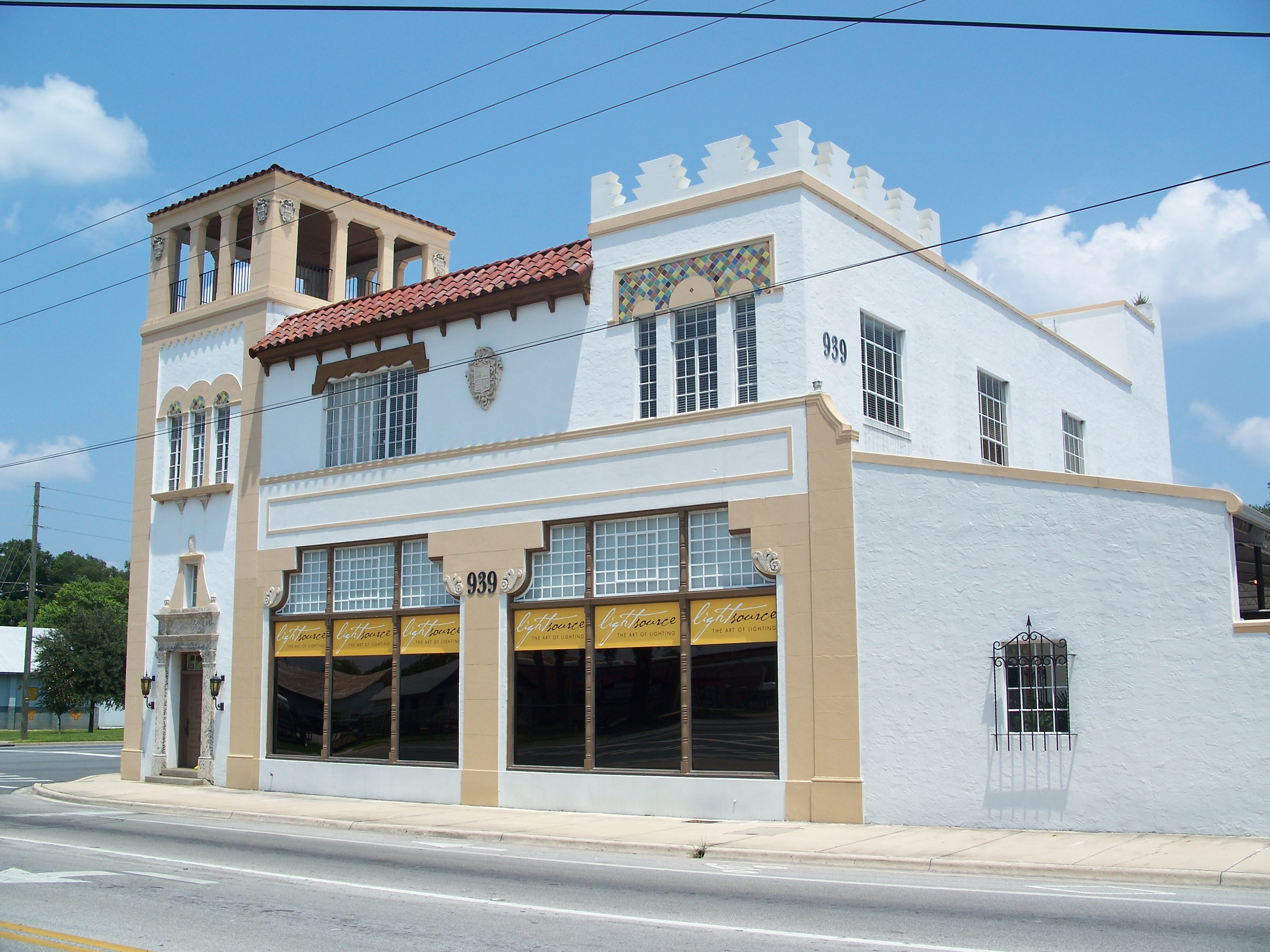

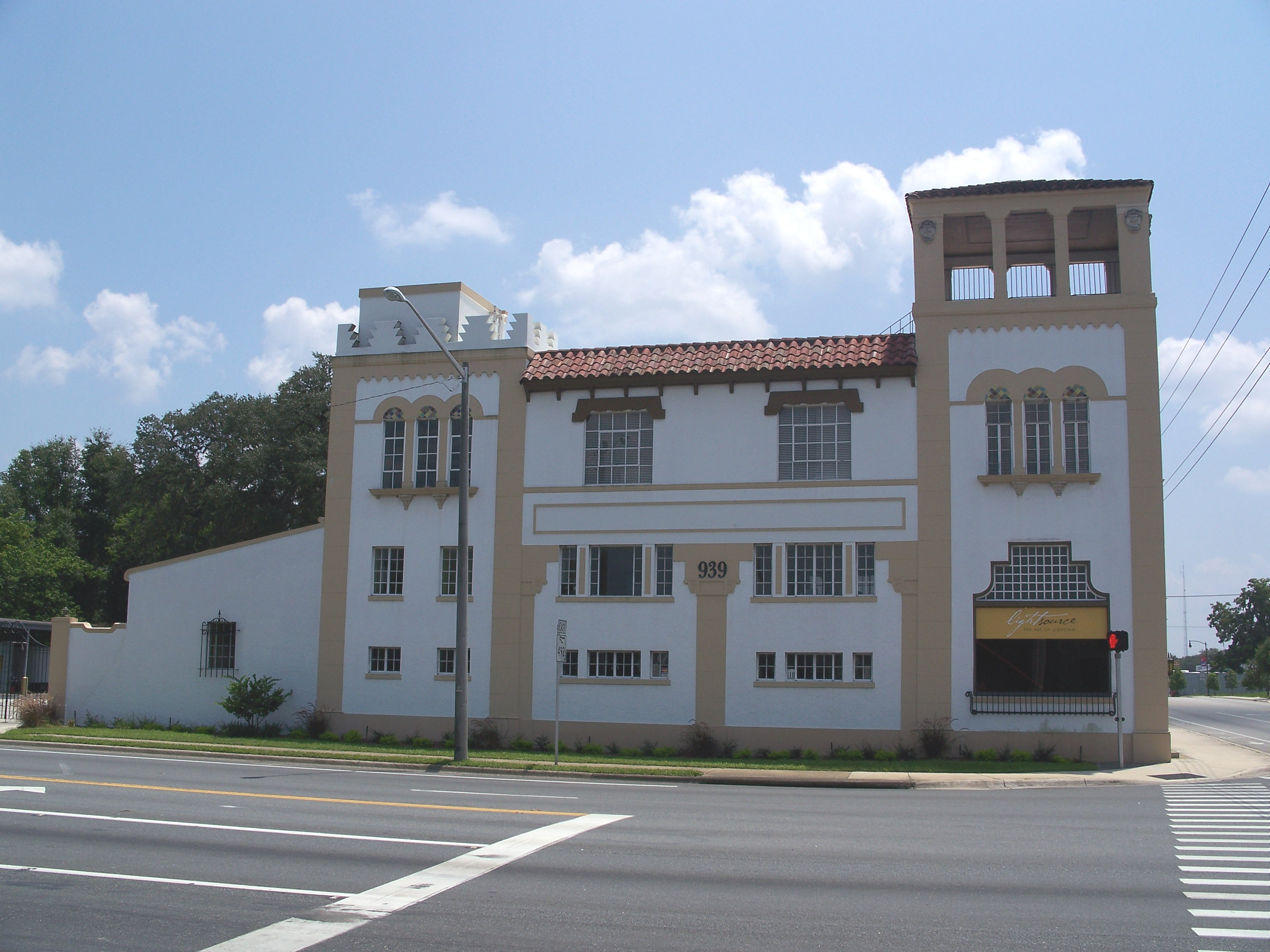

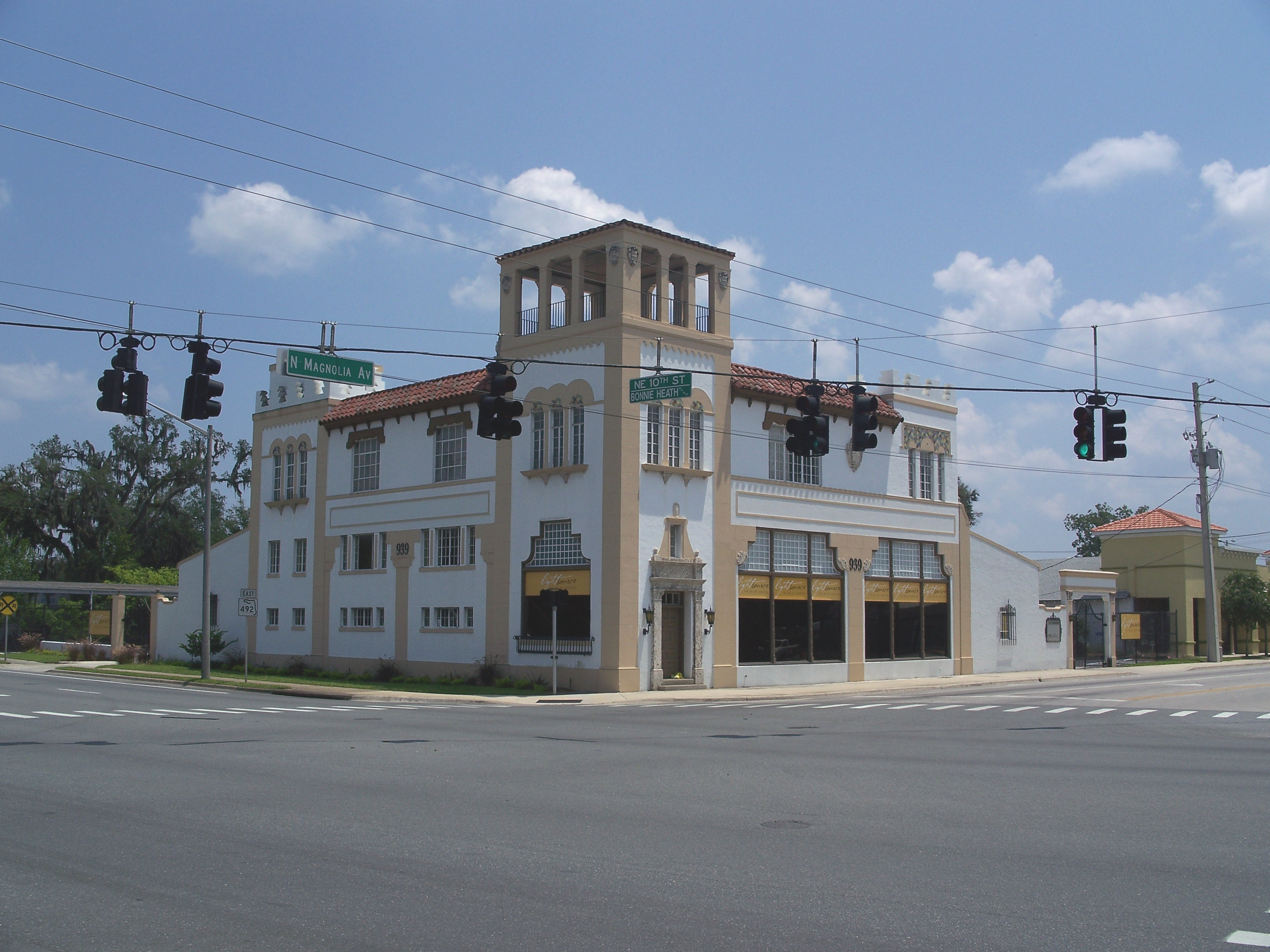

== See also ==
- Coca-Cola Bottling Plant (Fort Lauderdale, Florida)
- Coca-Cola Bottling Plant (Trenton, Florida)
- List of Coca-Cola buildings and structures
- National Register of Historic Places listings in Marion County, Florida
