= Pemberton Place =

Tourism district in Downtown Atlanta, Georgia

Coordinates: 33.7634441°N 84.3940544°W

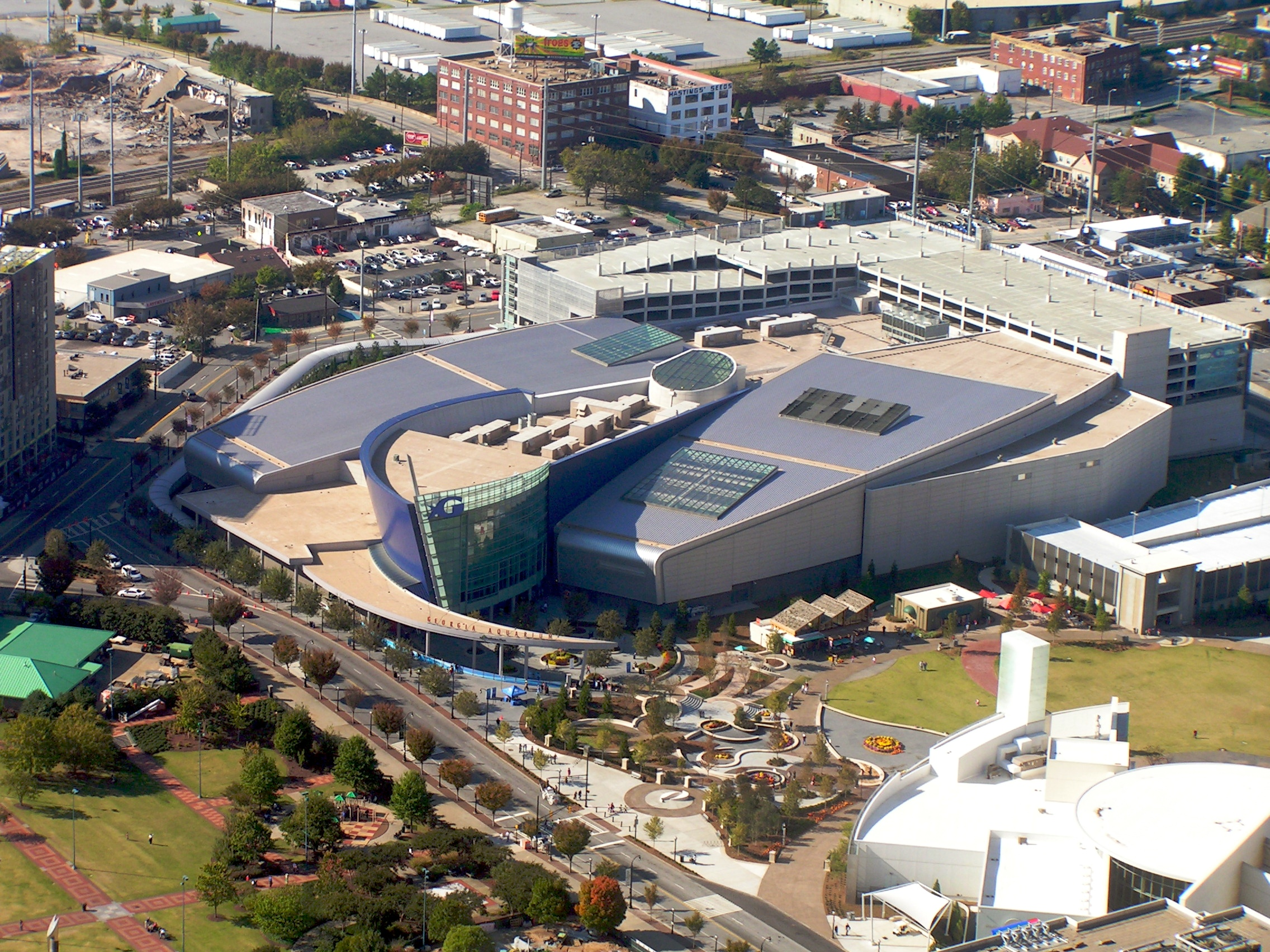
Pemberton Place

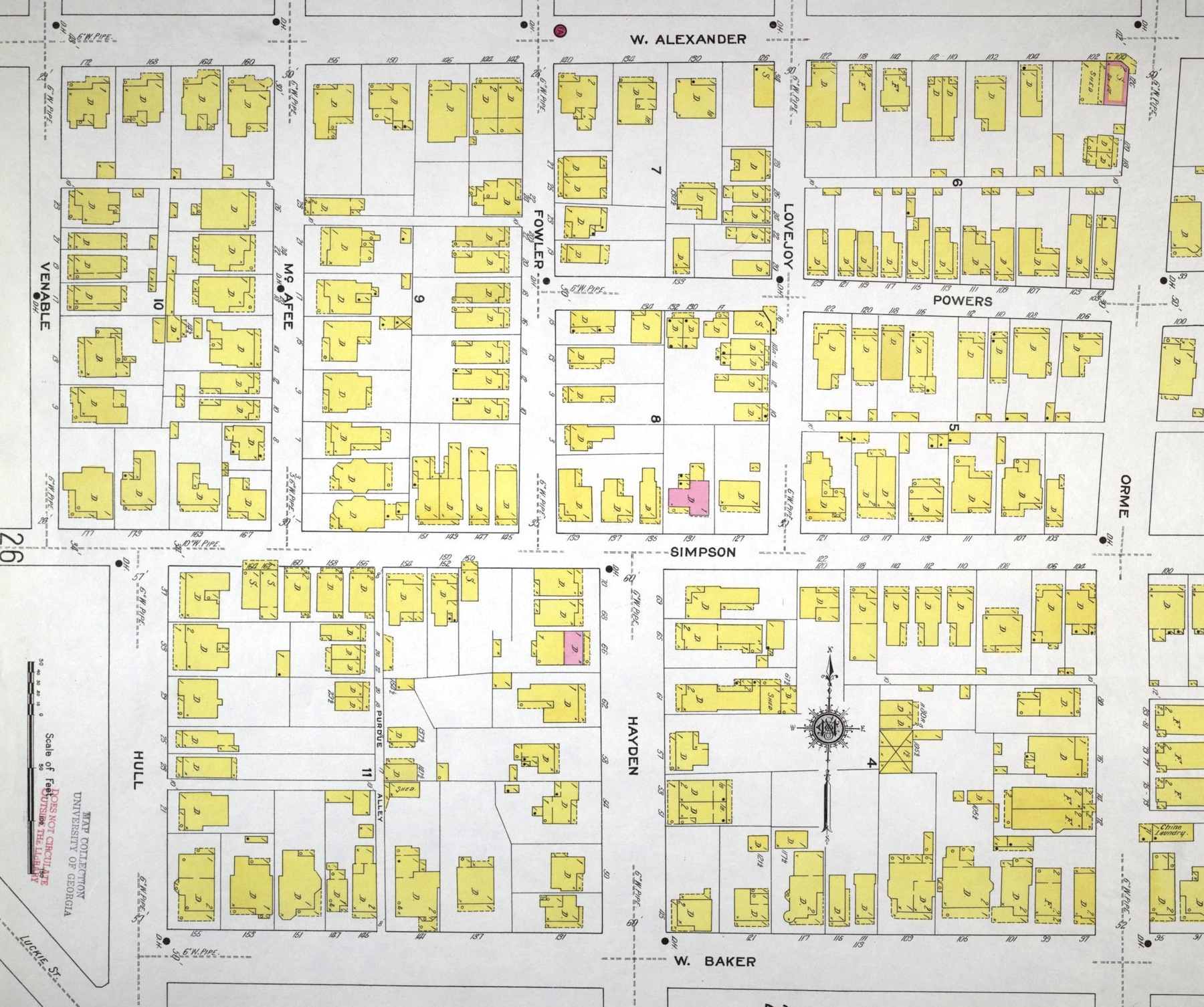
1911 Sanborn Fire Map of all but the westernmost section of what is today Pemberton Place, bounded by Baker, Luckie, Ivan Allen (Alexander), and Centennial Olympic Park Drive (Orme)

Pemberton Place, located in downtown Atlanta, Georgia, just north of Centennial Olympic Park in the Luckie Marietta district, is a complex that is home to the Georgia Aquarium, the World of Coca-Cola, and the Center for Civil and Human Rights. It is named after John Pemberton, the inventor of Coca-Cola.

== History ==
The area was originally ten city blocks of businesses, residences, etc.; it started to decline in the mid-20th century and by the early 1990s was considered a "long forgotten district of downtown". The Coca-Cola Company acquired property in the area and built Coca-Cola Olympic City there, for the 1996 Olympics. The company then donated the land in 2002, to provide a home for visitor attractions.

== Georgia Aquarium ==
The world's third largest aquarium with more than 8.1 million US gallons (31,000 m^{3}) of marine and fresh water, housing more than 100,000 animals of 500 different species. The aquarium's notable specimens include one whale shark, four beluga whales and three manta rays.

== World of Coca-Cola ==
The World of Coca-Cola is a permanent exhibition featuring the history of the Coca-Cola Company and its well-known advertising, plus a host of entertainment areas and attractions.

== Center for Civil and Human Rights ==
The Center for Civil and Human Rights opened in 2014 on the north side of the site. The center features four interactive exhibitions, including a gallery for continually rotating exhibits of items from the Morehouse College Martin Luther King Jr., Collection, where visitors can view the personal papers and items of Dr. King. The center also provides designated event spaces and educational programs.
