= COVID-19 pandemic in Illinois =

- Disease: COVID-19
- Pathogen: SARS-CoV-2
- Location: Illinois, United States
- First outbreak: Wuhan, Hubei, China
- Index case: Chicago
- Arrival date: January 24, 2020 (6 years, 9 months and 4 days)
- Confirmed cases: 4,139,537
- Recovered: 98% (recovery rate)
- Deaths: 36,870

Government website
- Official website (archived)

The COVID-19 pandemic began in the U.S. state of Illinois on January 24, 2020, when a woman in Chicago, who had just returned from the pandemic's place of origin in Wuhan, Hubei, China, tested positive for the virus. This was the second case of COVID-19 in the United States during the pandemic. The woman's husband was diagnosed with the disease a few days later, the first known case of human-to-human transmission in the United States. Community transmission was not suspected until March 8, when a case with no connection to other cases or recent travel was confirmed.

In mid-March, as the number of known cases rose into the double digits, Governor J. B. Pritzker issued a disaster proclamation, the state's equivalent of a state of emergency, to respond to the crisis. The state took measures to halt the spread of the disease by closing all schools and colleges, ordering a stop to eviction enforcements, ordering all bars and restaurants closed to sit-in diners, and otherwise restricting large gatherings of people. As the virus spread further, the state enacted an even stronger shelter in place order, affecting schools and businesses across the state. At first declared between March 21 and April 7, the order was later extended until April 30, then May 29.

During December 2020, Illinois experienced the second highest number of deaths per week, ranking fifth per capita, which spurred calls for Governor Pritzker to respond to the pandemic more aggressively. In January 2021, Illinois had the fifth highest number of confirmed cases in the United States.

As of May 26, 2021, Illinois had administered 11,049,665 COVID-19 vaccine doses, and 49% of the population was fully vaccinated.

== Timeline ==
=== January 2020 ===
On January 24, 2020, Illinois health officials announced the first confirmed case the novel coronavirus infection in the state of Illinois, also the second confirmed case in the United States. The case was a woman in her 60s who had returned from a December 25 – January 13 visit to Wuhan, China, the place of origin of the outbreak, where she had frequently visited a hospitalized relative and other relatives with respiratory illnesses. She began to experience symptoms after returning to Chicago, and was isolated at St. Alexius Medical Center in the Chicago suburb of Hoffman Estates.

On January 30, the Centers for Disease Control and Prevention (CDC) confirmed that the first known human-to-human transmission in the U.S. of the SARS-CoV-2 virus (then known as 2019-nCoV) had occurred in Chicago. According to the CDC, the woman who was the first Illinois case had transmitted the virus to her husband, who was confirmed as the second Illinois case and the sixth U.S. case after testing positive. He was isolated at the same hospital as his wife.

=== February 2020 ===
On February 7, the two Illinois cases were released from the hospital and began home isolation. Both made full recoveries and were released from isolation on February 14. On February 29, a third Illinois resident tested positive for the virus in suburban Cook County.

=== March 2020 ===
On March 2, a fourth case was announced by Illinois officials, the wife of the third case; she subsequently began home isolation. Other details were announced by officials: her husband had been isolated at Northwest Community Hospital in Arlington Heights since his case was reported two days earlier; both were in their 70s. The couple was possibly exposed to the virus through community transmission, with recent travel to Palm Springs. The man was later released to home isolation.

On March 5, public health officials in Chicago reported a fifth case of coronavirus in a man in his 20s. The man, a student at Vanderbilt University, had recently traveled to Italy to study abroad and returned to Illinois on a flight to Chicago O'Hare International Airport. The new case was hospitalized at Rush University Medical Center. On March 6, a sixth case was reported in Chicago. The patient, a classroom assistant in the Vaughn Occupational High School, had been on the Grand Princess cruise ship where multiple passengers had tested positive.

On March 8, a seventh case was announced in Cook County. The man in his 60s had not traveled to an area impacted by coronavirus and did not have any contact with other cases; as a result, Illinois officials reported the patient as the first evidence of community transmission within Illinois. He was also reported to be in serious condition. Additionally, a Missouri case connected to Illinois was confirmed; the patient had returned from Italy on a flight to O'Hare Airport, then took an Amtrak train to St. Louis, where she tested positive.

On March 9, four additional cases were announced in Cook County, bringing the state's total number of cases to eleven. Two of the new cases were family members of the classroom aide diagnosed on March 6; the two others included a California resident who traveled to Illinois, and a woman who had returned from an Egyptian cruise which was linked to many COVID-19 cases. In response to the growing number of cases in the state and the country, Governor J. B. Pritzker announced a disaster proclamation (a state of emergency) for the state of Illinois. On March 10, Governor Pritzker announced eight new presumptive positive cases, two of which were the first cases outside of Cook County (in Kane and McHenry Counties). These cases brought Illinois's total number of cases to 19.

On March 11, six new cases of the coronavirus were reported by officials, including the first in Lake County, bringing the total to 25. One of these cases was located at One Prudential Plaza, marking the first confirmed case in a major downtown Chicago office building. Illinois colleges and universities, such as Northwestern University and the University of Illinois, announced measures to combat the spread of the virus on their campuses through extensions of Spring Break as well as implementing online classes for part or all of the remaining semester. In response to the growing pandemic, both Former Vice President Joe Biden and Senator Bernie Sanders canceled campaign rallies planned for Illinois. Additionally, Chicago Mayor Lori Lightfoot canceled the city's annual St. Patrick's Day parade and Chicago River dyeing in response to coronavirus. On March 12, seven new cases of the coronavirus were reported by officials, including the first child who tested positive in Illinois. This brought the total to 32.

On March 13, fourteen new cases of the coronavirus were reported by officials, bringing the total to 46. Governor Pritzker announced statewide school closures beginning March 17 until March 30. Casinos statewide would close for fourteen days beginning on March 16. Additionally, the Circuit Court of Cook County announced that "no orders for an eviction or foreclosure will be entered during the 30-day period," and the Archdiocese of Chicago announced it would stop holding public Mass from March 14.

On March 14, the total number of cases in Illinois rose to 66. These included the first cases in Downstate Illinois, with patients testing positive in Woodford, Cumberland, and St. Clair Counties. A new case in DuPage County was the first Illinoisan resident of a long-term care facility to contract the virus. At O'Hare Airport, travelers returning from Europe faced enhanced screening from U.S. Customs officials due to the federal travel ban put in place the day before. The screenings led to long waits and overcrowded facilities in the airport, which both Governor Pritzker and Mayor Lightfoot harshly criticized as unsafe.

On March 15, the number of cases rose to 93. Cases were confirmed in Champaign, Clinton, Sangamon, Whiteside, and Winnebago Counties; meanwhile, Governor Pritzker ordered all bars and restaurants closed to sit-in diners. One of the cases in Sangamon County was a woman in critical condition who was hospitalized in Springfield, the state's capital. On March 16, the number of cases rose to 105, and Peoria and Will Counties confirmed their first cases. Governor Pritzker announced restrictions for public gatherings, limiting crowds to under 50 people amid growing concerns over the community spread of the virus in the state.

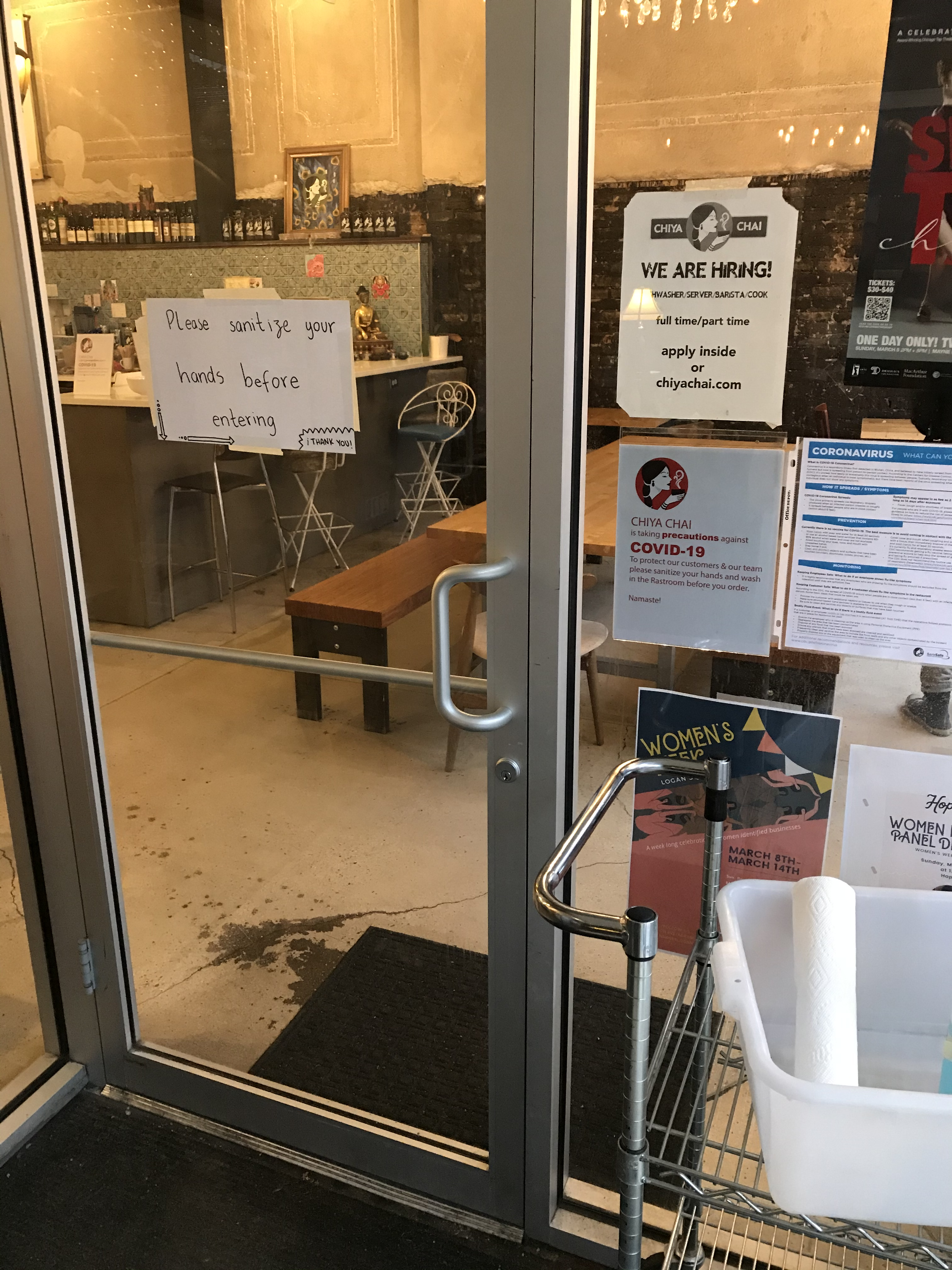
Signs during the outbreak asking restaurant patrons to wash and sanitize their hands

On March 17, the number of cases rose to 160. Officials announced the first death related to COVID-19, a woman in her 60s from Chicago; a retired South Side nurse, the woman had an underlying condition later revealed to be asthma, and died at the University of Chicago Medical Center. 22 of the new cases were confirmed at a Willowbrook nursing home, including 18 residents and four staff members; these cases were related to an initial case announced on March 14. Northwestern University, University of Illinois at Chicago, and the Illinois Institute of Technology confirmed that individuals on campus had tested positive for the coronavirus. Other new cases included employees at Midway International Airport and a Chicago Fire Department worker.

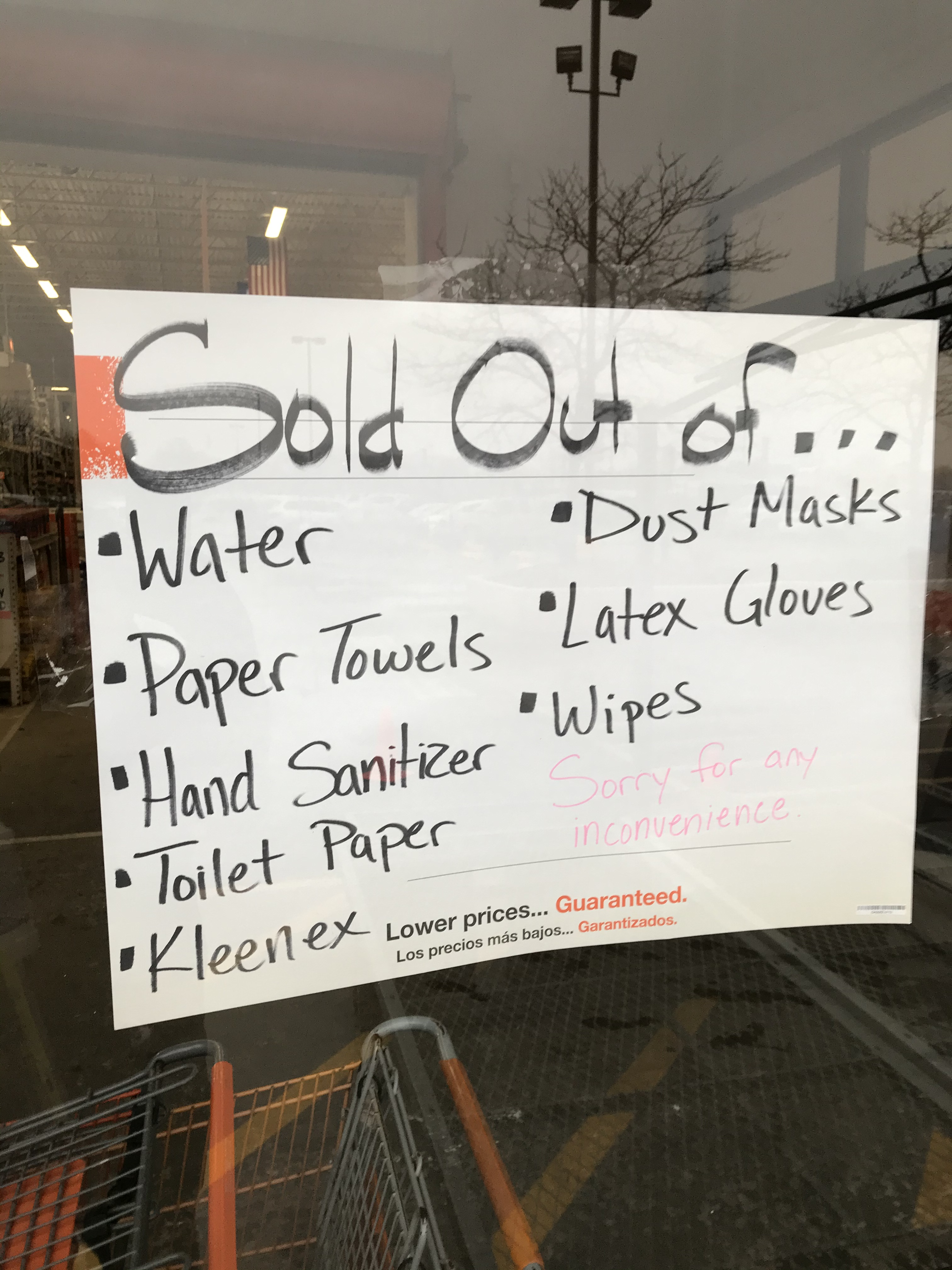
March 18, 2020 sign at a home improvement box store in Brickyard detailing what has sold out during the COVID-19 outbreak

On March 18, an increase of 128 new cases brought the total number of individuals infected to 288. Kendall and Madison Counties confirmed their first cases. The new cases included 20 more individuals at the Chateau Nursing and Rehabilitation Center in DuPage County, bringing the total number of the cases at the nursing home to 42. Many students and staff members in various schools and colleges in Illinois also tested positive.

On March 19, there were 134 new coronavirus cases reported throughout the state along with three deaths which included a male in his 50s from Will County, a female in her 80s from Cook County, and an out-of-state female in her 70s who was in Sangamon County. The number of cases being reported has rapidly risen as the tests are becoming more readily available along with an increase in testing by and hospital and commercial laboratories. The health departments of Adams and McLean Counties announced that they each had a confirmed case of COVID-19.

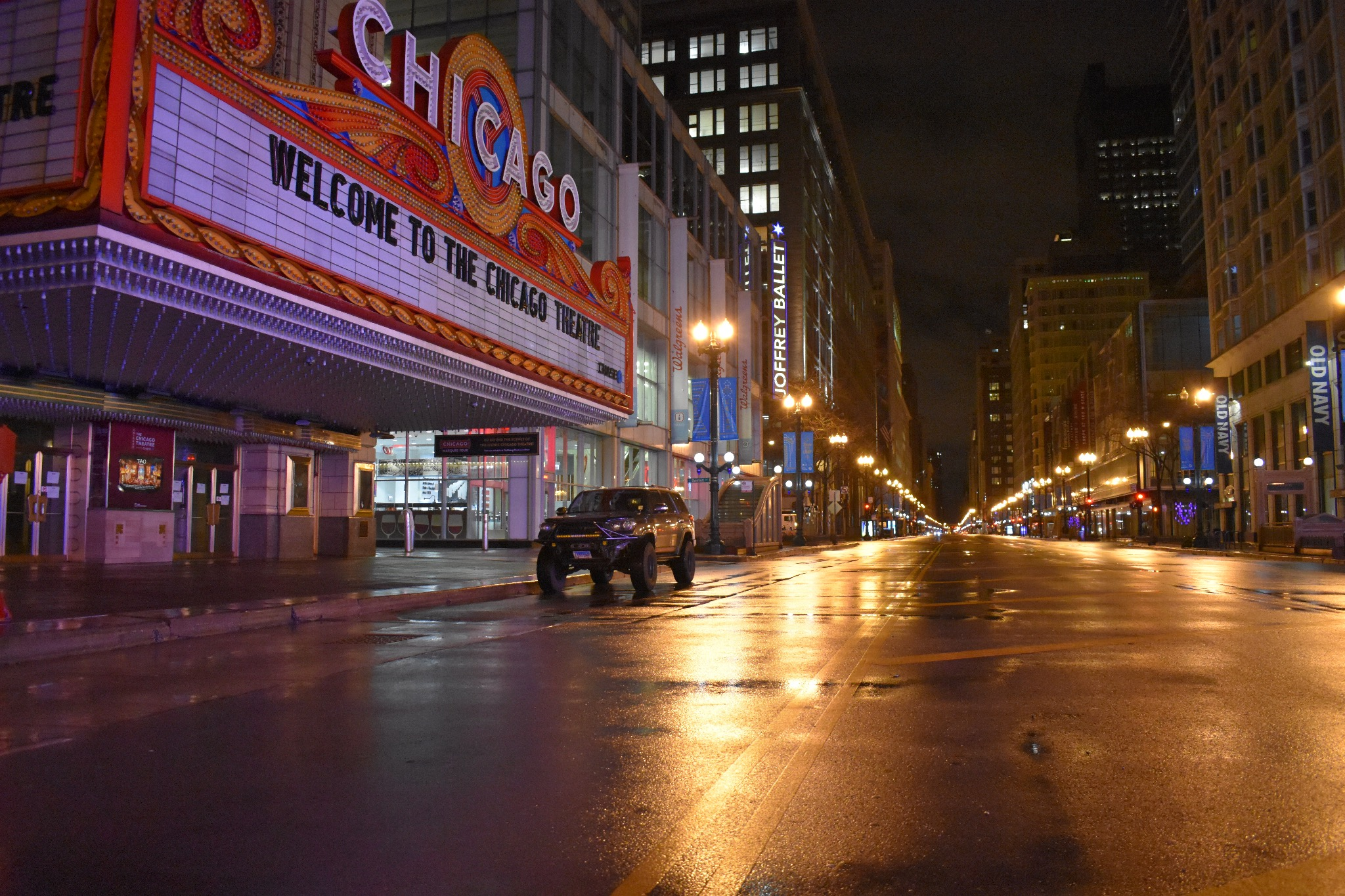
The Chicago Theater and empty streets on March 20, 2020

On March 20, the Illinois Department of Public Health announced that there was an increase of 163 new cases along with the death of a woman in her 70s in Cook County. The age range for those with confirmed contraction of the COVID-19 disease was from 3 to 99. Christian County announced the first confirmed case contracted within that county. Work began on converting McCormick Place into an alternate care facility for 3,000 patients. The $15 million project was paid for by FEMA and was scheduled for completion on April 30.

On March 21, there was an increase of 168 confirmed cases and another death, a man in his 70s in Cook County. This brought the total deaths from the coronavirus disease to six. DeKalb County reported its first confirmed case. Thousands of residents of Rogers Park, Chicago participated in #chicagosingalong singing Livin' on a Prayer by Bon Jovi. Bon Jovi sent congratulations via Instagram.

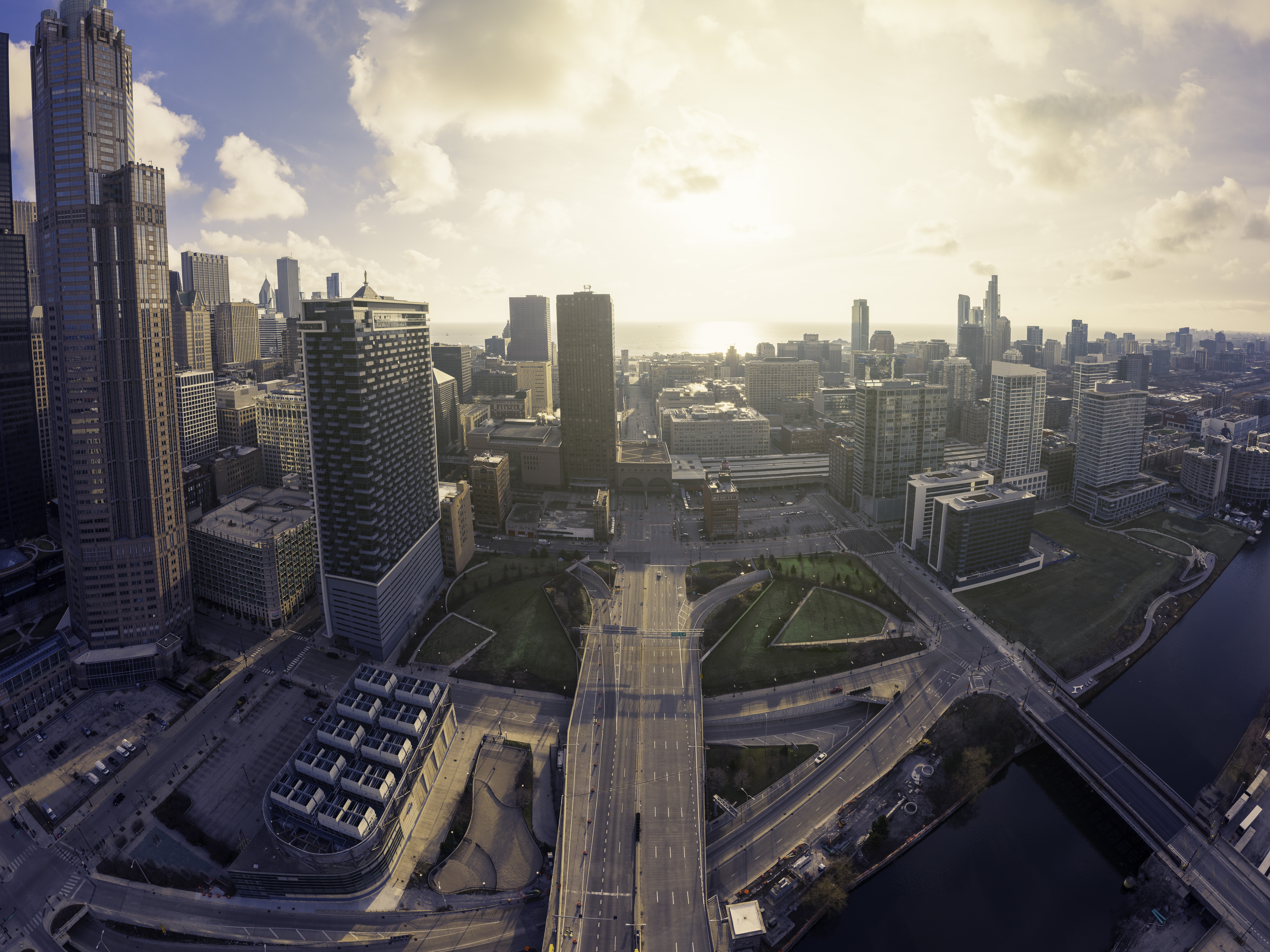
Streets of Chicago, empty on March 22, 2020

On March 22, the number of confirmed cases rose by 296 bringing the number of COVID-19 cases to 1049, one an infant. Officials announced three new deaths related to the disease, two men from Cook County that were in their 80s and a McLean County woman in her 70s. Jo Daviess, Livingston, Rock Island, and Stephenson counties all reported their first case.

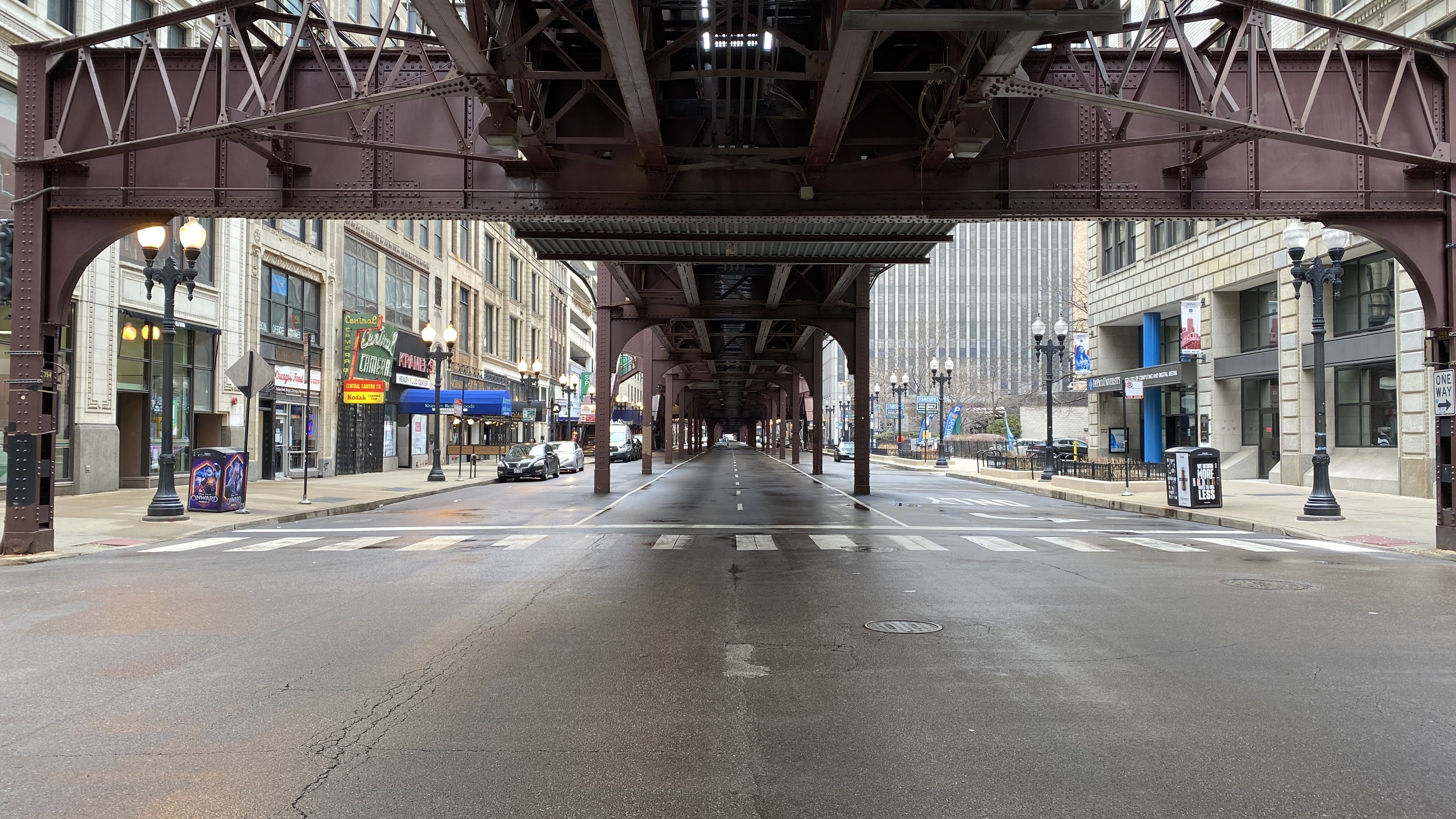
Chicago "L" tracks in Chicago over Wabash Avenue with empty streets on March 23, 2020

On March 23, officials announced another 236 cases and three more deaths, all men from Cook County, two in their 80s and one in his 90s. Monroe County announced its first case, bringing the total counties with confirmed cases to 31 of 102.

On March 24, there were 250 more confirmed cases of the coronavirus and four deaths. The dead were three from Cook County, two in their 60s and one was a male in his 50s; the fourth was a DuPage County resident in her 90s. Grundy County reported its first case.

On March 25, 330 more cases were announced along with three more deaths. The deaths were a Will County woman in her 50s, a Cook County man in his 60s, and a Kane County man in his 90s. Two Illinois Department of Corrections (IDOC) correctional officers along with one man incarcerated at Stateville Correctional Center tested positive with the coronavirus along with a contractual worker at Sheridan Correctional Center. Both correctional facilities went on 14-day lockdowns as a precaution. At the Stateville facility, those identified as being potentially exposed were quarantined to reduce risk to others. IDOC determined, after consulting with IDPH, that the staff and incarcerated men at the Sheridan facility was at low to medium risk of exposure. Two other incarcerated men at North Lawndale Adult Transition Center were confirmed to have the disease. Douglas, Marshall, and Morgan counties reported their first confirmed cases. Northern Illinois University (NIU) announced that two students tested positive for COVID-19. One of the students was briefly on campus on March 16 whereas the other student had not been on the campus since March 3 but had recently traveled with a small group of NIU students.

On March 26, the IDPH announced 673 new cases of coronavirus disease and seven deaths. The dead were a woman in her 90s, a man in his 70s, two men and two women in their 60s and a man in his 50s; no county information for these individuals was given. Iroquois County Public Health Department officials announced the first confirmed positive case in Iroquois County.

On March 27, another 488 new confirmed cases were announced along with eight new deaths. Of the fatalities caused by the coronavirus disease, seven were over the age of 60. Bureau and Henry counties announced cases on this date.

On March 28, officials announced another 465 new confirmed cases along with thirteen deaths, one an infant in Cook County. The other twelve deaths were from the following counties: Cook (two males in their 60s, two males in their 70s, a female in her 70s, a female in her 80s, and a male in his 80s), McHenry (a male in his 50s), Kane (two males in their 70s), Lake (a female in her 90s), and Will (a female in her 90s). Carroll, Fayette, and Macon counties reported their first cases on this day.

On March 29, there were 1,105 new cases and 18 additional deaths in six Illinois counties. Deaths were reported in the following counties: Cook (a male in his 50s, two females in their 60s, two males in their 70s, three females in their 70s, two in their males 80s, and a female in her 80s), DuPage County (a male in his 60s), Kane (a male in his 40s and two males in their 90s), Kendall (a male in his 60s), LaSalle (a male in his 80s), and St. Clair (a female in her 70s). Bond, Knox, Menard, and Montgomery counties reported their first confirmed cases on this date. The same day, Illinois Governor J.B. Pritzker announced that an infant in the city of Chicago died after testing positive for COVID-19. Infants made up a small fraction of COVID-19 related deaths worldwide, and this was the first death for any infant in the United States who tested positive for COVID-19 .

On March 30, Dr. Ngozi Ezike, director of the IDPH, announced that there were 461 new cases and eight deaths. Counties that reported deaths were Cook (a male in his 50s, a male in his 60s, a female in her 60s, a female in her 70s), DuPage (a male in his 60s), Kendall (a female in her 60s), and Will (a male in his 50s and a male in his 60s). One death was an incarcerated man from Stateville Correctional Center. Additionally, twelve men incarcerated at Stateville were hospitalized, with several requiring ventilators. An additional 77 prisoners with symptoms were isolated at the facility and eleven staff members were isolated. Testing for COVID-19 disclosed the first case of infection on March 22 in Cook County Jail. 10% of the 5,000 inmates were released as a cautionary measure, but the number of infections had risen to 134 by March 30. The first confirmed cases of coronavirus disease were announced on this day for Clark, Crawford, Marion, Randolph, and Saline counties.

On March 31, an additional 937 confirmed cases were announced along with 26 deaths that brought the death total to 99. Ford and Ogle counties reported their first confirmed cases. The following counties had deaths related to the disease: Cook (two males in their 50s, a male in his 60s, two females in their 60s, five males in their 70s, two females in their 70s, three males in their 80s, a female in her 80s, and a male in his 90s), DuPage (two females in their 70s), Kane (a male in his 80s), Lake (a female in her 60s), McLean (a male in his 70s), Morgan (a male in his 80s), St. Clair (a female in her 30s), Will (a male in his 80s and a female in her 80s).

=== April 2020 ===
On April 1, Massac and Vermilion counties both saw their first reported cases.

On April 2, Logan, Macoupin, Mercer, Moultrie, and Piatt counties all reported their first confirmed cases.

On April 3, DeWitt, Effingham, and Jersey counties reported their first confirmed cases of the disease.

On April 4, there were an additional 1,453 new cases along with 33 deaths across the state. These new cases brought Illinois over the 10,000 mark for a total of 10,357 confirmed coronavirus cases. Jasper, Lee, Mason, and Pike counties all reported their first confirmed cases on this date.

On April 5, Boone, Calhoun and Gallatin counties reported their first confirmed cases.

On April 7, officials with IDPH announced that there were 73 deaths due to the coronavirus, which as of this date was the highest increase of deaths since the pandemic began within the state. Coles, Lawrence, Richland, and Shelby counties all reported their first cases on this date. Counties that reported deaths included Champaign, Christian, Cook, DuPage, Ford, Kane, Kankakee, Lake, Madison, McHenry, Monroe, Tazewell, Will, and Winnebago.

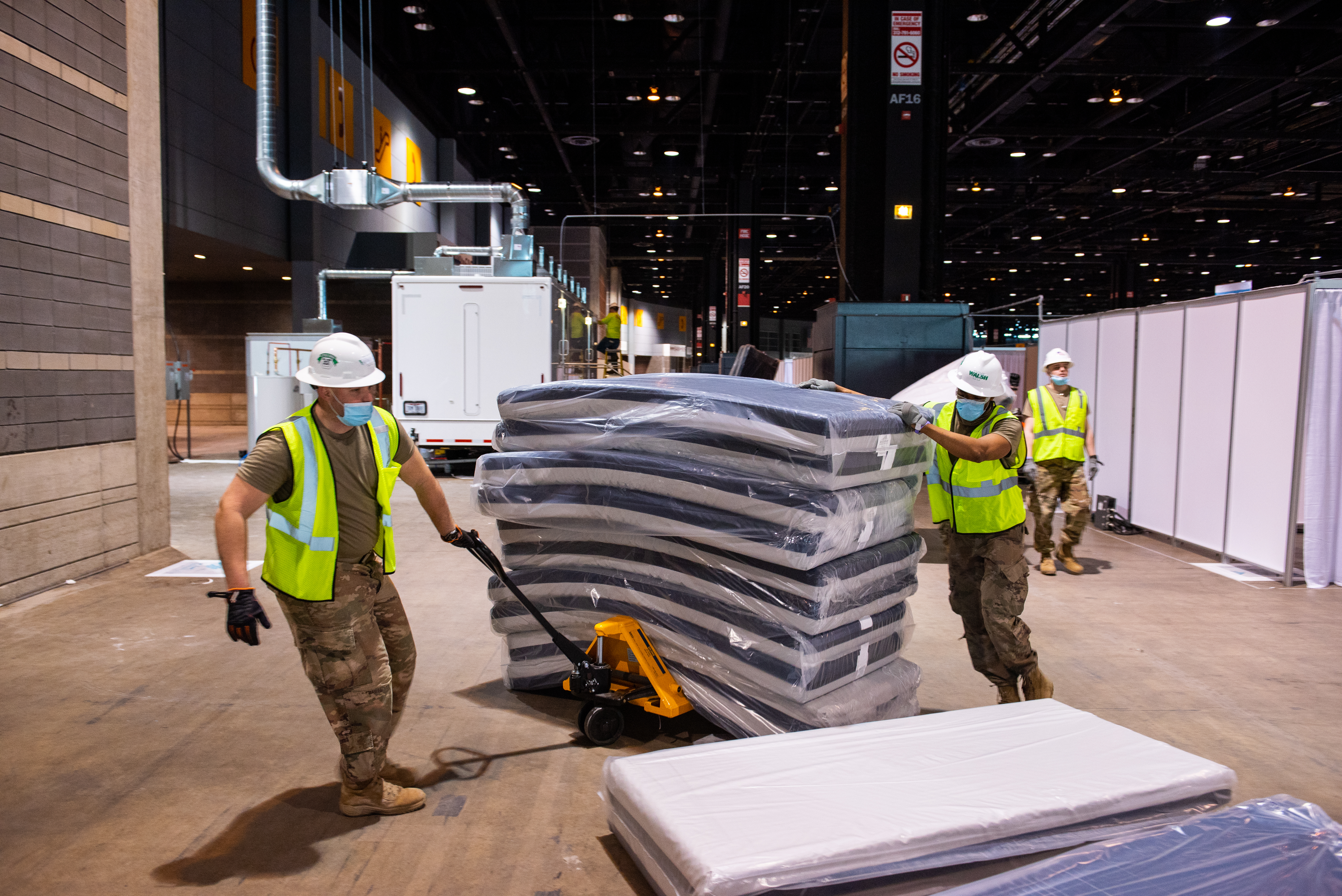
Members of the Illinois Air National Guard assemble medical equipment at the McCormick Place Convention Center in response to the COVID-19 pandemic in Chicago. April 8, 2020

On April 9, Hancock, Pulaski, and Schuyler counties reported their first confirmed cases.

On April 10, Fulton and Greene counties announced their first confirmed cases.

On April 11, McDonough, Perry and Warren counties reported their first cases. The Illinois Department of Veterans Affairs reported that an employee of the Illinois Veterans Home in Manteno tested positive for COVID-19 and is isolating at their home. There was no indication of any residents contracting the disease at any of the Illinois Veterans Homes throughout the State. At the Prince Home, a separate stand-alone facility on the Manteno grounds, which serves homeless veterans, four employees and two homeless veterans tested positive for COVID-19.

On April 12, the number of tests that had been performed passed 100,000.

On April 13 Johnson County announced their first confirmed case.

On April 14 Clay County announced their first case.

On April 15 the director of the Illinois Department of Public Health, Dr. Ngozi Ezike, announced Union County's first reported case.

On April 16 the number of positive cases of the coronavirus disease passed 25,000 with 1,140 new cases for a total of 25,733 cases. Alexander County reported its first confirmed case on this date which brought the number of counties with cases to 90 of the 102 within the state. There were an additional 124 deaths, which was the highest daily death total to date, to bring the total deaths to 1,072.

On April 17, the single day total of confirmed cases rose by 1,842 cases to bring the total cases to 27,575. This was due to the increased number of tests being performed daily across Illinois. Henderson and Wayne counties both reported their first cases of the coronavirus which brought the counties with confirmed cases to 92 of the 102 counties within the State of Illinois.

On April 18, officials announced Hamilton County's first case.

On April 19, Cook, DuPage, Kane, Madison, Monroe, Sangamon, St. Clair, and Will counties all reported deaths which increased the deaths by 33 for a total of 1,290.

On April 20, Cass and White counties both announced their first confirmed cases.

On April 21, Hardin County announced its first confirmed case.

=== May 2020 ===
On May 1, the number of new daily cases in the state reached 2,342 for a cumulative total of 56,055 cases.

On May 4, the number of new daily cases peaked at 2,556 new daily cases.

Between May 13 and 15, the number of new daily deaths peaked at 117.

On May 20, the state hit 100,000 cumulative cases.

=== June 2020 ===
On June 22, the state hit a nearly three-month low of 462 new daily cases, though numbers afterwards began to rise again, hitting 143,185 cumulative cases by the end of the month.

=== July 2020 ===
On July 3, the number of cumulative deaths passed 7,000.

On July 9, the number of new daily cases continued to rise in July, reaching 150,000 cumulative cases.

On July 16, 43,006 new tests were reported within 24 hours, setting a new daily record. In Cook County, the number of daily new cases was predicted to be less than 500 on average in the next two weeks.

On July 24, the Illinois Department of Public Health announced total confirmed cases in Illinois had reached 169,883, including 7,397 deaths in 102 counties.

On July 25, the state reported 1,426 new COVID-19 cases and 12 additional deaths, charting steadily rising statewide positivity rates reaching 3.6%, leading to stricter COVID-19 restrictions in the city Chicago to try to curb the upwardly trending numbers.

=== August 2020 ===
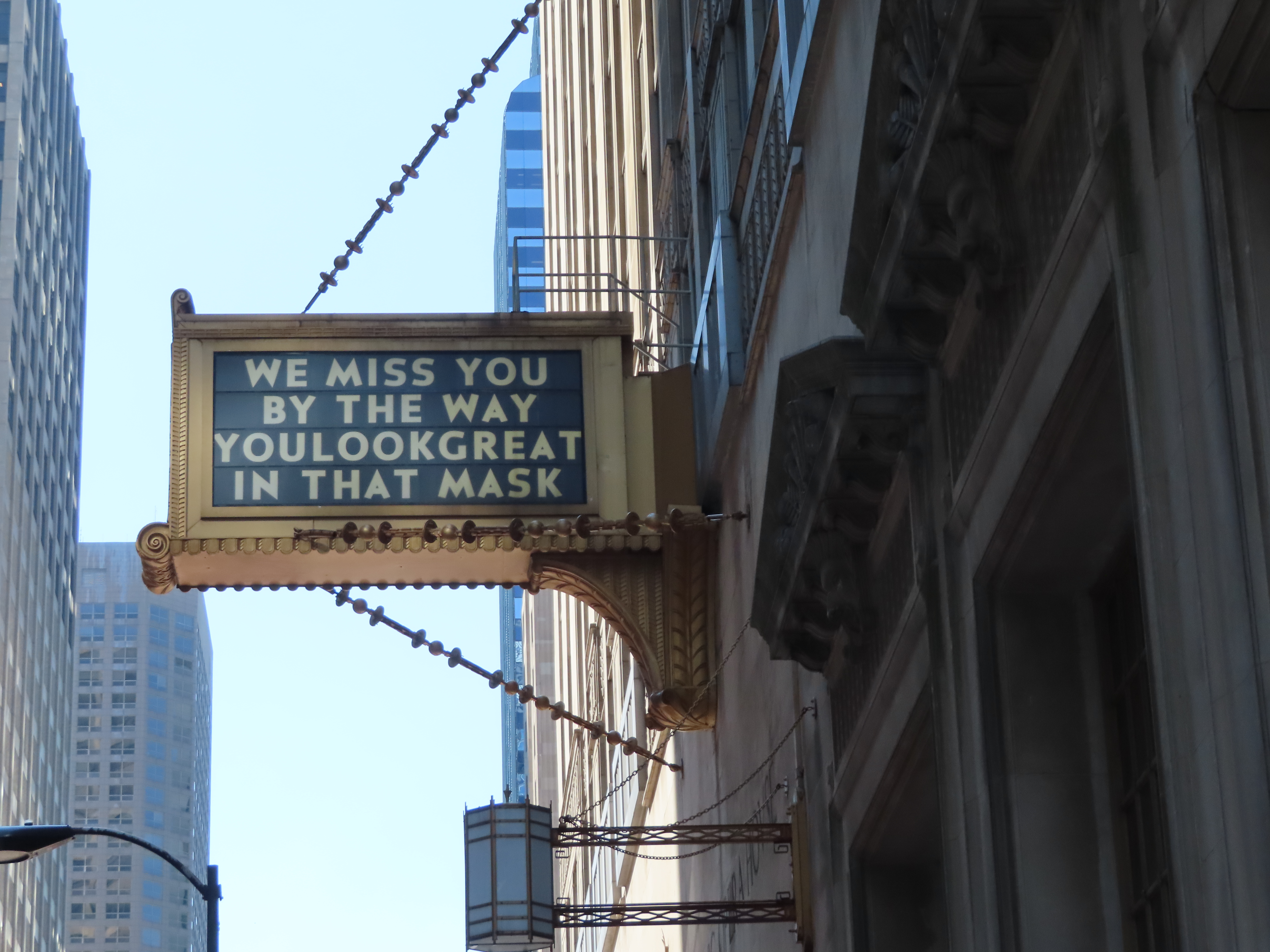
Mask-wearing message at the Chicago Civic Opera House

While the daily number of cases remained below the mid-May peak, the average slowly crept up through the month. The average daily case number in the week leading up to August was 1,475, while the average for the final week of the month was 2,003 cases.

=== September 2020 ===
On September 25, the state reported 2,514 new COVID-19 cases and 25 additional deaths, putting the state's positivity rate at 3.6%. The death toll from COVID-19 passed 8,500. There were 29,517 confirmed cases of COVID-19 and 4,642 deaths attributed to COVID-19 at long-term care facilities.

=== October 2020 ===
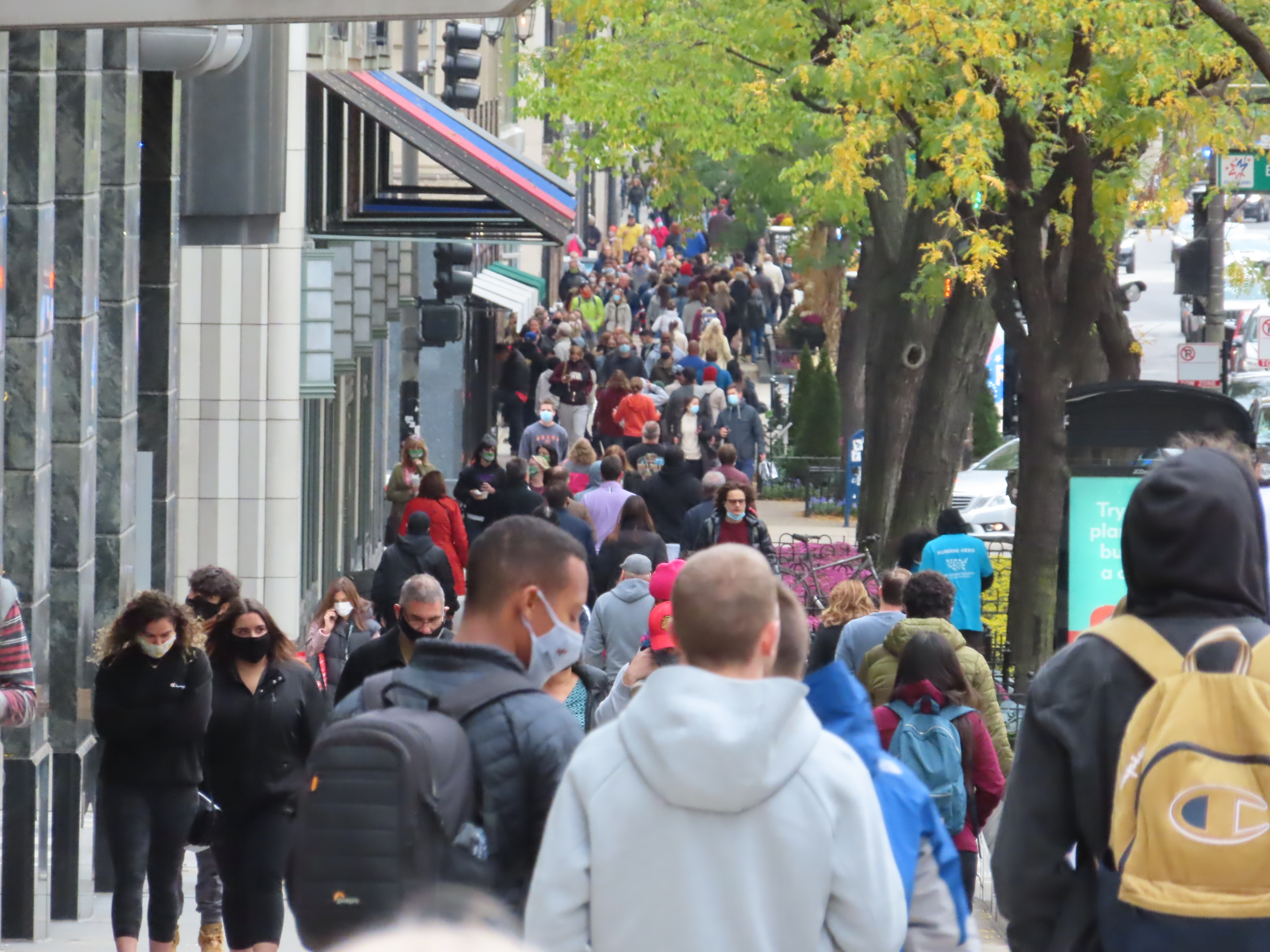
People in masks on Michigan Ave. in October 2020

On October 30, the state reported 6,943 new confirmed cases, the highest mark since the pandemic began, bringing the total number of confirmed cases to 402,401. The record was broken on the following day, October 31, with 7,899 cases.

=== November 2020 ===
On November 5, Illinois recorded 97 deaths, the most deaths in a single day since June 4, pushing the total deaths past 10,000 to 10,030. On the same day, Illinois set a new record for new cases, recording 9,935, which topped the previous record by more than 2,000.

The following day, November 6, the record was surpassed again, with 10,376 new cases being confirmed. The state began adding probable cases to the total on that day as well, and, as a result, an additional 7,600 cases were added to the total to compensate for every probable case since the pandemic began. On November 7, Illinois once again set a new record for the most cases in a single day with 12,438.

On November 10, Illinois passed 500,000 total cases, with 511,183 confirmed and probable cases since the pandemic began. This was accompanied by a new daily record for cases with 12,623, paired with the most COVID-related deaths in a day since July 17 with 79. The following day, November 11, Illinois once again set a new record for the most cases in a single day with 12,657. The state also reported 145 new COVID-related deaths, marking the most since May 27 and the 4th highest total ever. The test positivity rate also reached 12.4%. As of November 11, 5,042 Illinois residents were in hospitals due to coronavirus-like illnesses, with 951 in intensive care units and 404 on ventilators. On November 12, Illinois set another new record for the most cases in a day with 12,702.

On November 13, the record was broken for the fourth day in a row with 15,415 new cases. With 551,957 total cases, Illinois officially passed New York to have the 4th most cases of any state. On November 14, in addition to 11,028 cases, Illinois reported 166 new COVID-related deaths, the most since May 13 and the third most since the pandemic began. However, this number was inflated by a backlog from the previous day. On November 18, Illinois passed 11,000 deaths (11,014) and 600,000 cases (606,771). On November 19, the state recorded 14,612 new cases and 168 deaths, the second and third most since the pandemic began, respectively.

=== December 2020 ===
On December 2, due to a backlog from the Thanksgiving holiday, Illinois reported 238 COVID-related deaths, the most of any day since the pandemic began. Another 192 deaths were reported the following day, December 3, the second highest count since the pandemic began. This spike pushed the daily average for deaths to its highest point ever, even higher than the first peak in mid-May. Governor Pritzker said that, due to more backlogged reports from the holiday, it is hard to tell how much of the spike can be attributed to the delays.

A COVID-19 outbreak started on Veterans' Day on November 11 in the LaSalle Veterans' Home, infecting the majority of residents. By December 21, 34 residents had died of the disease.

=== June 2021 ===
On June 28, 2021, the Illinois Department of Public Health (IDPH) reported 85 cases at a summer youth camp in central Illinois. IDPH was only aware of a few vaccinated individuals, the camp did not check vaccination status, and masks were not required indoors. Two campers visited a nearby conference, resulting in another 11 cases. The camp was identified as Crossing Camp, a "Christ-centered" camp in Rushville, Illinois.

== State government response ==
On March 9, Governor J. B. Pritzker issued a disaster proclamation, the state's equivalent to a state of emergency, as four new cases were announced in the state. Starting on March 9 onwards, Pritzker and the Illinois Department of Public Health conducted daily press briefings about the crisis. On March 18, Governor Pritzker announced a new website that would be a centralized hub with information an resources related to the coronavirus and the impact on Illinois residents and businesses.

During March, the state government announced a series of escalating measures to achieve social distancing. On March 13, Governor Pritzker announced that all schools in Illinois would close for a period to begin the following Tuesday and last until the end of the month. The governor's announcement came after hundreds of public school districts and private schools had already announced closures. On March 15, Governor Pritzker announced that all bars and restaurants would be closed until March 30 to "[enforce] and [preserve] the safety and health of all residents of Illinois." Businesses with delivery and takeout options would still be able to serve. On March 16, Governor Pritzker announced that all gatherings of 50 or more people would be canceled in accordance with new CDC guidelines. The Illinois Gaming Board suspended all video gaming operations at all licensed video gaming establishments and suspended gambling operations at all casinos from March 16 until March 30. On March 20, Governor Pritzker announced a statewide stay-at-home order starting on March 21 until April 7, 2020. All non-essential businesses were required to be closed (e.g. theaters, parks, libraries, etc.) whereas essential businesses such as grocery stores, gas stations, hospitals, pharmacies would remain open. On March 31, Governor Pritzker extended the statewide stay-at-home order until April 30. On April 23, Governor Pritzker extended the statewide stay-at-home order through May 29 with some modifications. Churches were also prohibited from holding meetings with more than 10 people in attendance. Some churches defied the governor's order, held meetings and then filed federal lawsuits.

Services offered by the state government were also affected. Illinois Secretary of State Jesse White announced that all driver services facilities throughout the state would be closed from March 17 through March 31. White's office stated that expiration dates would be extended by 30 days through an emergency rule, including those for driver's licenses, identification cards, vehicle registrations, document filings and other transactions. The Illinois Department of Natural Resources announced that all state sites, which include state parks, fish and wildlife areas, recreational areas, and historic sites would be closed until further notice. This also included the Illinois State Museum and its branches which include the Research and Collections Center, Dickson Mounds Museum in Lewistown and the Lockport Gallery in Lockport. On March 27, the Illinois Secretary of State, Jesse White announced that notaries public were granted the authority to perform remote, online notarizations during the COVID-19 pandemic via an executive order. This authority was temporary and set to expire when the state disaster proclamation was removed.

These changes were accompanied by public policy responses from the state government. On March 25, Governor Pritzker announced the Illinois tax filling deadline was being extended from April 15 to July 15 by the Illinois Department of Revenue. Pritzker also announced three new emergency assistance programs that allow for small businesses to have access more than $90 million in aid. These programs were available through the Illinois Department of Commerce and Economic Opportunity (DCEO).

The state government also coordinated a public health response. The State of Illinois worked with U.S. Department of Health and Human Services and the private companies of Wal-Mart and Walgreens to provide testing sites in the hardest-hit communities within the state. In a March 22 interview on CNN's State of the Union, Governor Pritzker compared the federal government's procurement of essential medical supplies to the "Wild West". "We're competing against [other states], we're competing against other countries," Pritzker said. When asked about protective masks for medical workers, FEMA Director Peter Gaynor could not give any specific answers. On March 31, a CMAS Severe (emergency alert) notification was issued to smartphones in Illinois and neighboring states with the message: "State needs licensed healthcare workers to sign-up at IllinoisHelps.net to fight COVID-19." The message was initiated by Illinois Healthcare Professional Emergency Volunteer Program, a state-run emergency response organization.

Five years later, Pritzker said that Trump had demanded that Pritzker's office "praise him on the Sunday talk shows" in exchange for "life-saving equipment". "That is literally a deal that he put in front of me." Pritzker said he agreed to do this to "save lives" as "hospitals were filling up." Trump, however, "never delivered" on his end of the deal, according to Pritzker.

On March 17, 60 members of the Illinois National Guard were activated to assist during the COVID-19 pandemic in Illinois for the anticipated need of medical staffing and logistic support. Of those 60, 43 are airmen from the Peoria-based 182d Airlift Wing's Medical Group whereas the other 17 are planners and liaison officers from both the Army and Air National Guard. On March 26, roughly 50 additional Illinois National Guard soldiers from the 1844th Transportation Company based in East St. Louis were activated to assist with the COVID-19 response operations. The majority of those activated soldiers helped with medical warehouse operations in central Illinois, while four soldiers were assigned to the State Emergency Operations Center in Springfield, to assist with communications and help plan potential flood response operations.

Governor Pritzker unveiled on May 5 a five-phase plan for reopening the state called "Restore Illinois". Each phase had specific thresholds that must be met and divided the state into four zones, based on IDPH's Emergency Medical Service regions, which could progress through the phases individually. The phases were: Phase 1 – Rapid Spread, Phase 2 – Flattening, Phase 3 – Recovery, Phase 4 – Revitalization, and Phase 5 – Illinois Restored. Within the same briefing, the Governor announced that Illinois was in Phase 2 of the plan. Governor Pritzker announced on May 26, 2020, that the statewide coronavirus test positive rate had averaged 9.2% over the prior seven days, less than half the rate of 23% during the peak in April. Illinois entered Phase 3 on May 29, 2020, with the exception of Chicago which entered Phase 3 on June 3, 2020. The entire state moved into phase 4 on June 26, allowing for larger gatherings of up to 50 people and the re-opening of restaurants and bars, albeit under social distancing and mask-wearing guidelines.

On August 7, Pritzker modified the state's response including changing the Emergency Medical Services to 11 regions and tightening the metrics for restrictions.

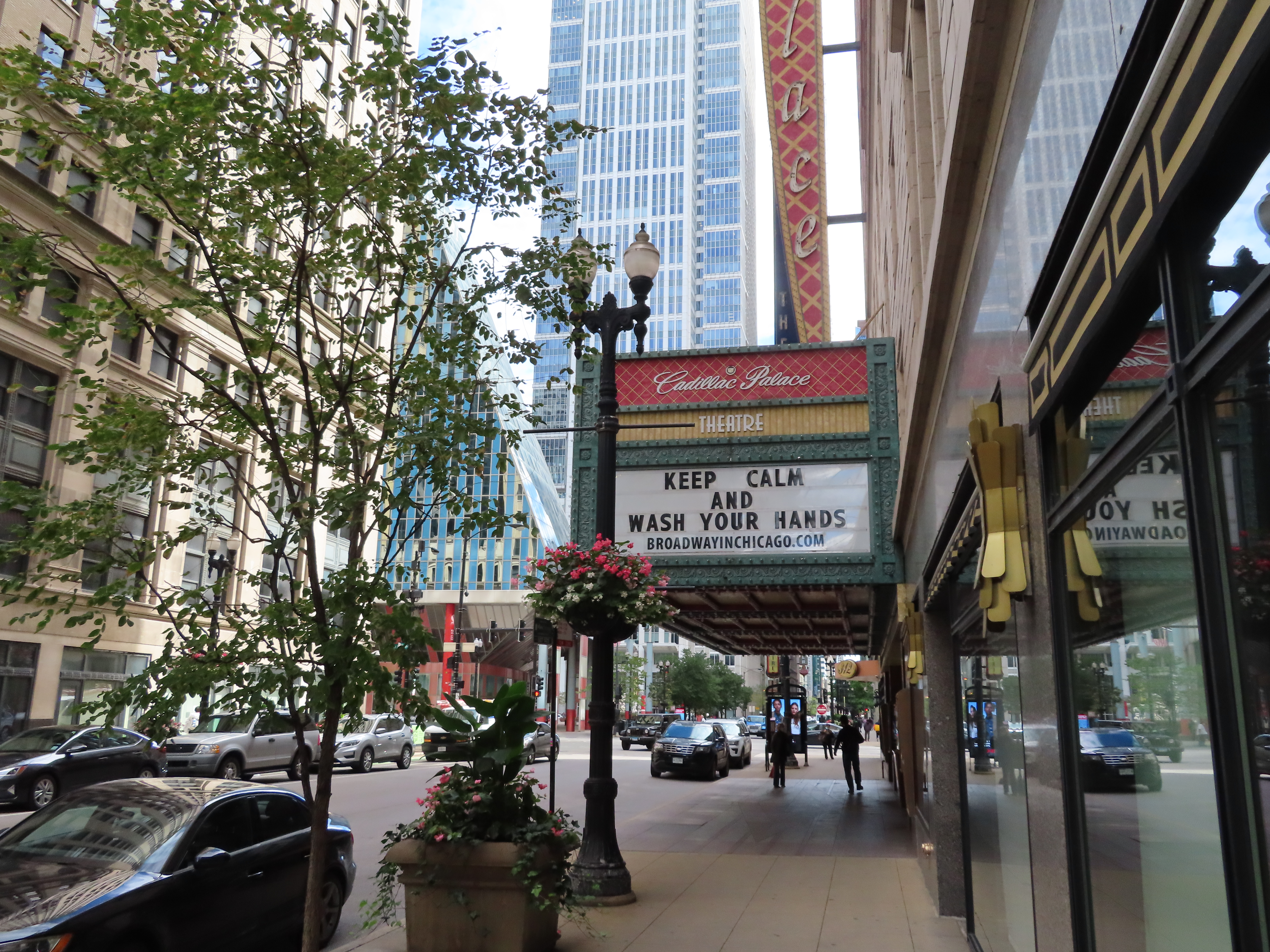
"Keep calm and wash your hands" sign at the Cadillac Theater, September 2020.

On September 21, Illinois passed the 5 million mark for the number of COVID-19 tests administered, to be the state with the third highest number of tests administered, behind New York and California.

In late October, Governor Pritzker began announcing tightened restrictions to many regions around the state, with 9 of 11 regions seeing the restrictions by October 29, including Chicago. The restrictions included a ban on all indoor dining, limiting social gatherings to 10 people, and limiting organized gatherings to 25% room capacity or 25 people, whichever is lower. Governor Pritzker laid guidelines to postpone high school basketball, but the IHSA voted to continue on schedule. By November 4, all 11 regions were under heightened restrictions.

On October 29, Illinois passed 7.5 million total COVID-19 tests.

On November 4, Illinois passed 8 million total tests administered.

On November 11, in anticipation of Thanksgiving, the IDPH issued new guidelines. Despite Governor Pritzker's hinting, no formal stay-at-home order was issued. The IDPH recommended that, for the next three weeks, all Illinois residents avoid leaving their homes for non-essential activities. They also recommended that businesses allow employees to work from home and limit all non-essential gatherings. Illinois Regions 5, 7, and 8 restrictions were increased to Tier 2. The regions encompass the southernmost portion of the state as well as Will, Kankakee, Kane and DuPage counties. These new restrictions, in addition to all of the restrictions already in place, included reducing the party size in bars and restaurants to six people, capping all social gatherings at 10 people, with the exception of schools and office & retail spaces, and limiting organized gatherings to 25 people or 25% room capacity, with the exception of fitness centers.

On November 17, Governor Pritzker announced that, on November 20, all of Illinois would enter Tier 3 restrictions. In addition to the Tier 2 restrictions, there would be no indoor dining, health and fitness centers were capped at 25% capacity, had to require face coverings at all times, and keep locker rooms closed, and hotels had to limit capacity to registered guests. Arcades, casinos, rec centers, theaters, and museums were all required to close. Governor Pritzker said that he hoped that these mitigations would bend the curve and prevent a stay-at-home order.

On November 25, Illinois surpassed 10 million total tests administered, with nearly 700,000 of them being positive.

== Local government response ==
=== McHenry County Department of Health ===
On April 11, the McHenry County Department of Health (MCDH) issued a press release pertaining to a court order granting access to the personal health information for patients that had contracted COVID-19 by multiple police agencies. These patient records are protected with the Health Insurance Portability and Accountability Act of 1996 along with State of Illinois' Medical Patient Rights Act. Both acts restrict access to patient records from individuals that unless medically necessary. The MCDH determined that providing access to the addresses of the patients with confirmed cases of COVID-19 would suffice both the request by police agencies and both patient privacy acts. However, the rationale by the police agencies "to protect their officers and deputies by allowing them to avoid contact or don protective equipment" and the McHenry County court issued a temporary order to release the names. The agencies which requested this information are police departments of City of McHenry, Village of Algonquin, City of Woodstock, and the Village of Lake in the Hills as stated within the court order from the 22nd Judicial Circuit Court in McHenry County.

=== City of Alton ===
On April 3, Alton Mayor Brant Walker provided his weekly address regarding COVID-19 via a video on the City of Alton's Facebook page. In the video he stated that he had directed the Alton Police Department to use discretion towards those who did not comply with the State of Illinois stay-at-home order. On April 6, Alton Police were investigating a large gathering at Hiram's Tavern located in downtown Alton, which was in violation of the stay-at-home order. Officers issued criminal complaints to all in attendance, including the mayor's wife who also was in attendance at the establishment. Each complaint was a class A misdemeanor charge that was punishable by up to 364 days in jail and/or a fine of $2,500. The mayor's statement regarding his wife was "I instructed the Police Chief to treat her as he would any citizen violating the 'Stay At Home' order and to ensure that she received no special treatment".

=== City of Carbondale ===
On April 6, Carbondale City Council passed two ordinances with the first declaring a state of emergency and the second to provide guidance on how to enforce the stay-at-home order that was issued by the State of Illinois. The first ordinance allows the city manager the abilities to close any city facility in order to ensure the health and safety of city employees and the community, to enter into temporary agreements with bargaining units to ensure continuation of city services and to adjust personnel policies, designate areas for carry-out and curbside pickup from restaurants in the downtown area of the city, and to extend deadlines for licenses issued under the city code. The ordinance also officially suspends the charging late fees for water and sewer, stopping the disconnection of water and sewer service for non-payment, extension of the payment deadline of the city's food and beverage tax along with the package liquor tax until May 20, extends the motor fuel taxes and hotel/motel taxes until April 30. An additional item that was added was the suspension of the enforcement of the tall grass and weed ordinance. The second ordinance allowed for a streamlined process of the enforcement of the multiple executive orders issued by Governor Pritzker. Typically these orders would be sent through the Jackson County Health Department and then to the Illinois Department of Public Health for review and then off to the county state's attorney for enforcement. Instead these orders will be processed by the City of Carbondale and enforced by the Carbondale Police Department by way of fines up to $750 per day and alleviates a "minor violation from becoming a misdemeanor or felony charge".

=== City of Chicago ===
On March 12, Chicago Mayor Lori Lightfoot announced that after meeting with Comcast executives, the company would "double internet speeds to low income households nationally. Also, 60 free days of internet for low income households" would be available starting March 16.

On March 26, the City of Chicago closed parks, beaches, the 606 trail network, and the lakefront due to too many people gathering, with violators facing fines and possible arrest.

On April 8, Mayor Lightfoot placed a curfew on all liquor sales after 9:00 pm in the City of Chicago. This curfew went into effect on April 9 and remained in place through the end of the state's stay-at-home order.

On May 17, days after the city was sued by a Romanian church that had been ordered not to hold church services even with social distancing, the mayor closed street parking for 9 blocks on Sunday.

On May 26, the City of Chicago created the Chicago PPE Market, built on Rheaply's Asset Exchange Manager, to connect Chicago's small businesses and nonprofits with city-approved personal protective equipment (PPE) suppliers. In preparation for the reopening of the city, small organizations can use the platform to access necessary protective supplies.

On May 26, Mayor Lightfoot announced that the city would spend $56 million from federal and state funds on a contact tracing program, including $11 million marked for a contractor to oversee the program. Several progressive activists and elected officials opposed the latter part of the proposal, arguing that the funds should be used to support the Chicago Department of Public Health rather than hiring a contractor. On September 14, Mayor Lightfoot announced the hiring of 500 contract tracers through 31 community organizations.

On November 12, in anticipation of typical Thanksgiving travel and gatherings, Mayor Lightfoot announced a "Stay-at-Home Advisory" for the city, effective November 16, asking residents to "shake off COVID fatigue" and avoid inviting over extended family. She said that, if the measures are ignored, the city would be "on track to lose 1,000 more Chicagoans by the end of the year or even more." The announcement came as the COVID-19 test positivity rate for the city reached 14.1%.

=== City of Rockford ===
On March 30, the Rockford city council passed an ordinance allowing for fines of $750 per day for businesses not adhering to the closure of nonessential businesses during the statewide executive order issued by Governor Pritzker.

=== City of Springfield ===
On March 27, Springfield Mayor Jim Langfelder issued an emergency order that restricted public use of the Municipal Center complex. This order prohibits anyone other than city employees conducting public business from assembling, loitering or storing personal property at the municipal complex which included the city's public library, Lincoln Library and Howarth Plaza. Both of these places are popular amongst the city's homeless population. On March 31, Mayor Langfelder issued a second order that halts all evictions and the repossession of vehicles within Springfield and lasts the duration of Governor Pritzker's executive order that was declared on March 20. On April 8, Mayor Langfelder issued another emergency order allowing for the Springfield Police Department to issue tickets and fine individuals who are "repeat offenders" who do not adhere to the prohibition of gatherings of more than 10 people and overall lack of compliance with the State's Stay-at-Home order.

== Schools and universities ==
On March 9, Loyola Academy in Wilmette canceled classes due to potential exposure of a student to the virus.

In the following days, several universities in Illinois closed or cancelled classes. Northwestern University extended its spring break by one week, after which classes would be held remotely rather than on campus. The University of Illinois and Northern Illinois University took similar measures, adding that residence and dining halls would remain open.

Many more Illinois schools, both public and private, announced closures in the following days, including the Archdiocese of Chicago. When Chicago Public Schools did not announce a closure, the Chicago Teachers Union demanded that the district close its schools immediately. On March 13 Governor Pritzker announced that all schools in the state would be closed between March 17 and 30, and later extended to at least April 8. On March 19 Mayor Lori E. Lightfoot announced that Chicago Public Schools would remain closed until Tuesday, April 21, 2020. On March 31, Governor Pritzker extended the statewide school closures until April 30. On April 17, Governor Prizker announced that all schools in the state would stay closed for the remainder of the school year.

=== University of Illinois Urbana-Champaign response ===
UIUC COVID-19 response
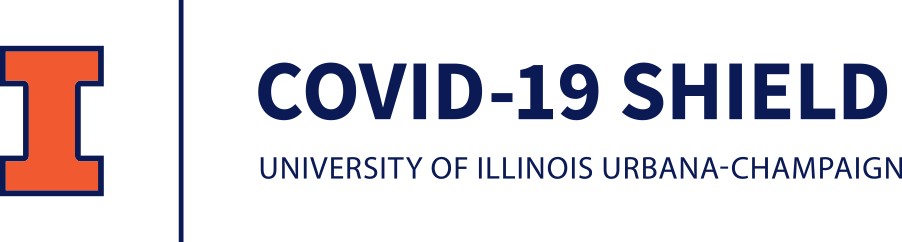
- Formation: March 2020; 6 years ago
- Location: Champaign–Urbana, Illinois
- Parent organization: UIUC
- Website: covid19.illinois.edu; Shield Testing Data

==== Preparations for COVID-19 management ====
===== Saliva test =====
In April 2020, a team was formed to develop and deploy large-scale COVID-19 testing for use on the UIUC campus. The possibilities of using a saliva test were explored; such a test may be a good indicator of how contagious a person is: it tests the fluid which is likely responsible for much of the transmission between people. The team, headed by Paul J. Hergenrother of the UIUC School of Chemical Sciences, included people in the university's Institute for Genomic Biology, the Carle Illinois College of Medicine, the Beckman Institute for Advanced Science and Technology, the Department of Microbiology, and the College of Veterinary Medicine where a veterinary diagnostic lab was repurposed for handling the demands of analyzing thousands of samples per day.

As this team began its work, reports of methods to detect the virus in swabs, without the time-consuming RNA-extraction step, were appearing, and on April 10, 2020 Rutgers University received FDA emergency use authorization (EUA) for a saliva test (which included RNA extraction). Within two months of the UIUC team's formation, a scientific paper documented the team's research on a rapid saliva test which replaces RNA extraction by heat inactivation, with no need for laboratory personnel to open the vial after an individual provides a saliva sample. Meanwhile, Yale University developed a test which requires that proteinase K enzyme be inserted into the vial before the heat inactivation step.

As a CLIA-certified lab, the campus's veterinary diagnostic lab was able to satisfy the Food and Drug Administration's test requirements within the FDA's LDT regulations. By early July 2020 this lab was running the saliva procedure on samples provided by UIUC employees and students.

===== Safer Illinois app =====
Starting in mid-March the university developed a smart-phone app to play an important role in the UIUC campus response to the COVID-19 pandemic. The "Safer Illinois App," which had a soft launch on June 8, was built on the ROKWIRE open-source smart-phone platform, established at UIUC in 2018. This was a natural platform to use, since ROKWIRE was already serving the campus with its first product, the "Illinois App."

On August 13, 2020, days before students arrived for the fall semester, the Safer Illinois App was announced as operational. Two days later the saliva test lab started analyzing increasing numbers of samples 7 days per week.

===== Modeling =====
A mathematical model was used to estimate the number of people who would test positive in entry screening during August 15–23. An estimate, made on July 24 using an existing UIUC model of COVID-19 dynamics in Illinois, projected forward to mid-August to estimate of the percentage of infected people within the state of Illinois in mid-August: 0.44%. Based on this, the detection of roughly 200 positive infections was anticipated during entrance screening, with 95% confidence interval of 72 to 414 infections. For students in University Housing, about 5% of the campus room inventory was reserved for isolation or quarantine.

==== 2020–2021 academic year ====
A total of 55,034 tests were performed during the August 15 through 23 return to campus, with 288 people testing positive. This number falls within the "entry screening" model's 95% confidence interval of 72 to 414 positives. This 0.5% positivity continued during the first week of classes, August 24 through 28. The next four days, August 29 through September 1, saw 588 positive tests, almost equaling the number of positives during the previous 14 days. This was deemed to reflect risky behavior, particularly among undergraduates. On September 2 a campus massmail announced a university-wide two-week "essential activities only" period and announced increased efforts to identify and remove individuals who were creating risk for the campus and the community.

At this time, New York Times writer Kenneth Chang credited the overall UIUC COVID-19 response as "one of the most comprehensive plans by a major college to keep the virus under control" and contrasted the UIUC approach to that of most other large state universities "opening and hoping for the best without doing any kind of serious testing or they've switched to largely online education" quoting biologist Carl Bergstrom. During the second week of "essential activities" there was a sizable decrease in the number of cases observed, and, on September 16 a campus massmail ended the two-week period.

Initially the UIUC plan was to test each individual once per week. However, based on modeling studies this was changed to twice per week before large numbers of students arrived on campus in August. This rate was characterized by Nick Anderson of the Washington Post as "a staggering pace for a large public school".

Soon, this rate of testing strained the laboratory's ability to produce rapid results, which weakened the ability of the testing program to quickly identify people who should go into quarantine. At the same time, it became clear that fewer than 5% of positive tests were from among faculty, staff and graduate students. So, on September 7, 2020, testing of these groups was reduced to once per week. This, combined with an expansion of laboratory capacity, caused laboratory turnaround times to reduce from as high as 48 hours early in the semester to a little over 8 hours by early October.

The number of positive tests reached a semester-low of 85 new COVID-19 detections during the week of October 10 through 16, then increased steadily during the following three weeks. On November 10, the university announced that faculty, staff and graduate student positivity was increasing rapidly, so these groups were required to resume twice-per-week testing.

== Socio-economic impact ==
=== Economic impact ===
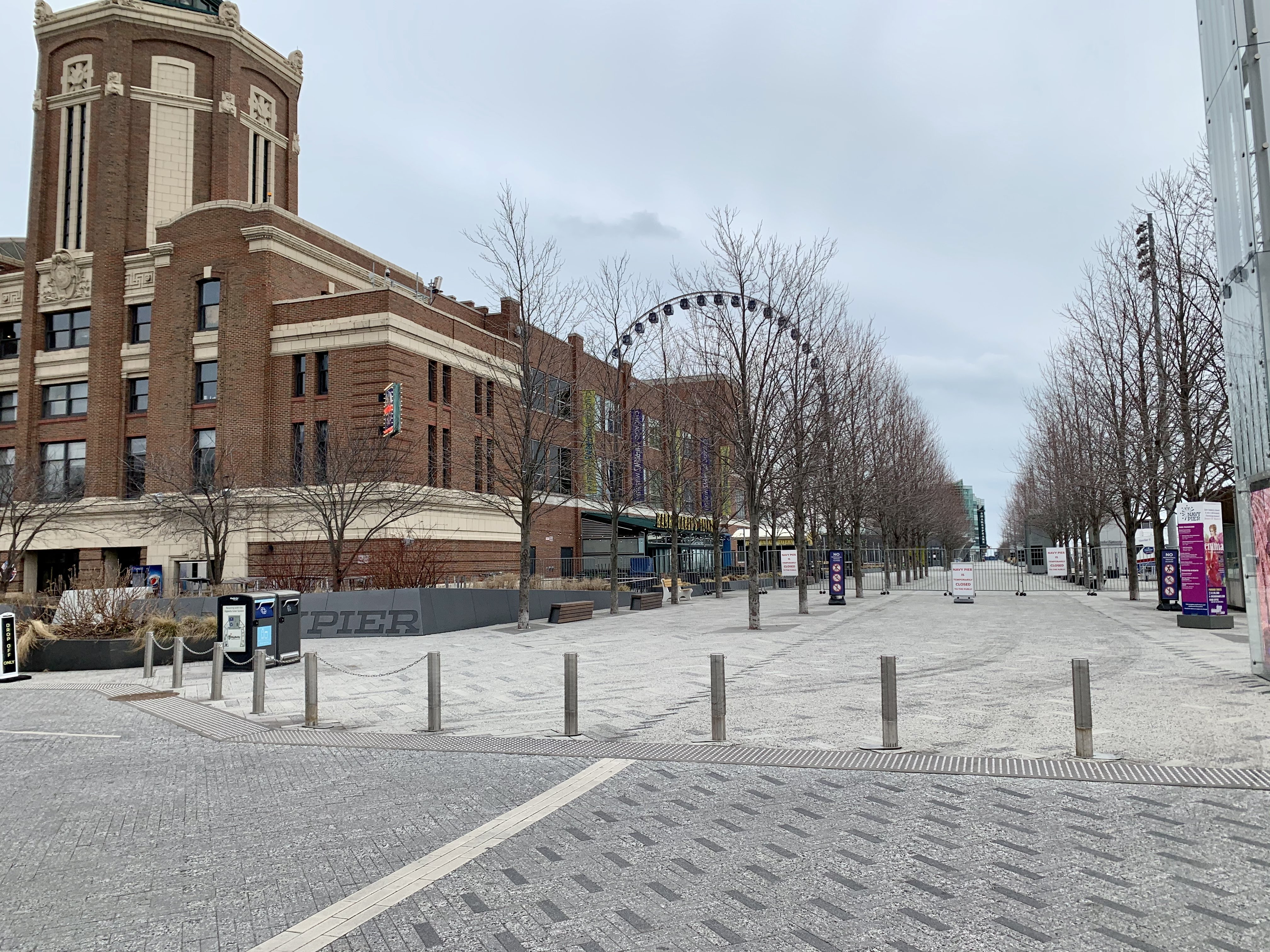
Navy Pier, closed on March 22, 2020

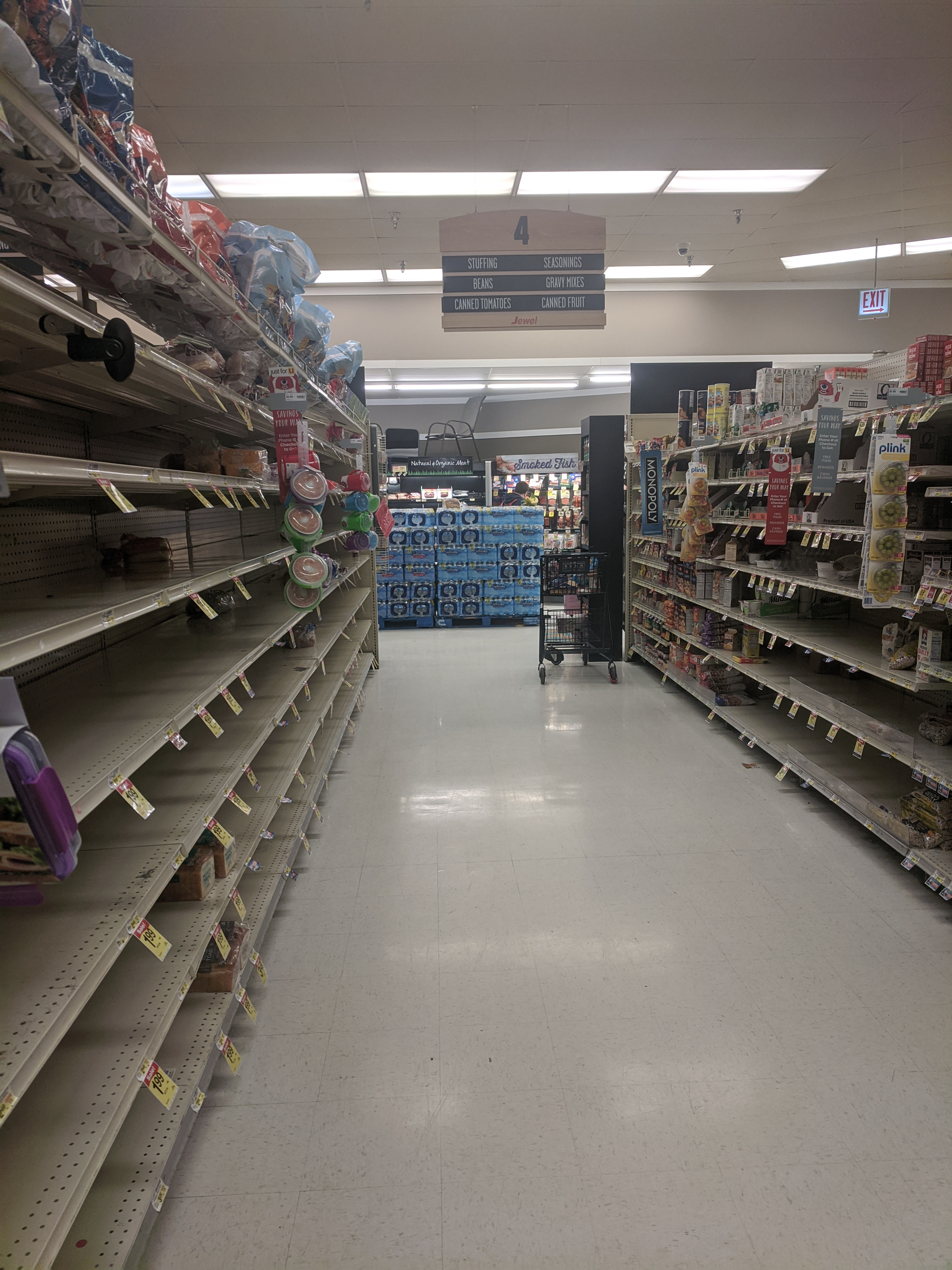
Empty shelves due to panic buying in a Jewel supermarket in Lincoln Square, Chicago

From March 16 until May 6, American Airlines, which has a major hub at O'Hare International Airport in Chicago, suspended long haul international flights, reducing its international capacity by 75%.

Chicago's Navy Pier announced that it will be closed to the public until April 2. Navy Pier closed again September 8, 2020 due to low attendance and remained closed until spring 2021.

On March 15, Pritzker ordered all bars and restaurant dining rooms to close from March 17 to 30 to mitigate the spread of the coronavirus affecting the state. As of September 25, 62 restaurants in Chicago closed due to the financial impact of COVID-19.

United Airlines, whose primary hub is at O'Hare International Airport in Chicago, canceled 95% of its international flights in response to the pandemic starting in April. United reported a $2.1 billion loss in the first quarter of 2020, blaming restrictions on the aviation industry due to the COVID-19 pandemic.

=== Racial inequality ===
In early April, a number of news organizations analyzed data provided by the Illinois Department of Public Health, the Cook County Medical Examiner's Office, and the Chicago Department of Public Health showing that African Americans experienced a disproportionately higher death rate due to the virus. African Americans accounted for 42% of coronavirus-related deaths and 30% of confirmed cases statewide, despite only comprising 14% of the state's population. In Cook County, African Americans accounted for 58% of deaths while comprising 23% of the population. A similar pattern emerged in the city of Chicago, where 72% of deaths and 53% of confirmed cases were African Americans, who make up 30% of the city's population. Likewise, throughout all of 2020, Latinos have had higher rates of testing positive for COVID-19 than other ethnicities, from 20% higher on May 3, 2020, to only 3% higher in June. On April 16, the Cook County government launched a dashboard with regularly updated information on coronavirus-related deaths, disaggregated by race.

On April 6, Chicago Mayor Lori Lightfoot announced a plan to address the racially disproportionate impact of COVID-19, proposing surveillance of grocery and corner stores, increase bus service to the city's South and West sides, and a "racial equity rapid-response team." On April 9, a group of progressive African American activists and elected officials (including Chicago Alderwoman Jeanette Taylor, Cook County Board Commissioner Brandon Johnson, and Illinois House Rep. Sonya Harper) called for a range of policy reforms to address this racial inequality. Their demands included a rent and mortgage holiday, a freeze on utility payments, increases in paid sick leave and hazard pay, and an end to cash bonds. They also called for a stop to the use of the pandemic as an "excuse to double-down on racist policing," reporting that residents of heavily black neighborhoods in Chicago were being told about a 5pm curfew and being ticketed and detained for being outside.

Statistics data tracked through mid-May revealed that black people accounted for 25% of US deaths despite only making up about 13% of the US population; Hispanics made up 24% of deaths while only making up about 18.5% of the population; and white people accounted for 35% despite making up roughly 60% of the population. The AMA Center for Health Equity released a report in October listing structural and social determinants that contributed to the Latino population's higher rates of infection and death. Federal public health officials released a new strategy addressing inequalities, and officials at the Centers for Disease Control and Prevention clarified earlier messaging to emphasize that the disproportionately high impact of COVID-19 on minority groups is not due to genetics but rather social conditions that place people of color at higher risk for exposure and serious illness. Reasons cited include working in industries with no sick pay, front line jobs where working from home is impossible, multi-generational and multi-family accommodation, and insufficient space to isolate or quarantine. Combined, academics have referred to these factors as 'structural vulnerability'; Blacks, Latinos, and other marginalized groups are at greater risk of contracting COVID-19 and may have access to fewer resources to mitigate its effects. Within the Latino community, additional factors are language barriers, fear of deportation, and invisibility in national discourse and rhetoric.

Although COVID-19 vaccinations began in December 2020, black and Latino populations are not vaccinated at the same rates as whites, and their neighborhoods continue to have more COVID-19 deaths as of February 2021. According to the Chicago Tribune, blacks and Latinos are getting vaccinated at half the amount as whites. U.S. Rep. Jesús "Chuy" García cited factors such as language barriers, healthcare deserts, and fear of deportation. Although the governor said their administration was focusing on improving vaccination access alongside the Illinois National Guard, community leaders such as Rev. Emma Lozano of Pilsen's Lincoln United Methodist Church have remained skeptical.

== Prisons ==
Over March and April, in response to the rise in coronavirus cases, the Illinois Department of Corrections (IDOC) released a number of prisoners early, looking to curb the impact of the pandemic on a vulnerable population. This was accompanied by an executive order by the governor on March 26, suspending further admission to IDOC from county jails. Quarantines were also implemented at these locations, suspending in-person visits. Despite these measures, there were outbreaks of COVID-19 from March onwards, among both prisoners and staff. As of July 9, there have been 203 cases of COVID-19 among prison staff in the state, and 337 cases of COVID-19 among prisoners. Stateville Correctional Center, the largest prison in the state, had the largest number of recorded cases, with 266 cases among prisoners and staff.

== Impact on cultural events ==
=== Sports ===
Most of state's sports teams were affected. Major League Baseball cancelled the remainder of spring training on March 12, and on March 16, they announced that the season will be postponed indefinitely, after the recommendations from the CDC to restrict events of more than 50 people for the next eight weeks, affecting the Chicago White Sox and Chicago Cubs. Also on March 12, the National Basketball Association suspended the season for 30 days, affecting the Chicago Bulls. Also on that date, the National Hockey League, suspended the season indefinitely, affecting the Chicago Blackhawks. Also on March 12, Major League Soccer suspended the season for 30 days, affecting the Chicago Fire FC. On April 3, the Women's National Basketball Association announced that the beginning of the season originally scheduled for May 15 would be delayed indefinitely, affecting the Chicago Sky.

In college sports, the National Collegiate Athletic Association cancelled all winter and spring tournaments on March 12, most notably the Division I men's and women's basketball tournaments, affecting colleges and universities statewide. On March 16, the National Junior College Athletic Association canceled the remainder of the winter seasons as well as the spring seasons. Also on March 12, the Illinois High School Association announced the cancellation of most remaining winter State Series postseason tournaments, with basketball being the main activity affected.

On May 28, 2020, the PGA Tour announced that the John Deere Classic in Silvis would be cancelled for 2020.

NASCAR was scheduled to race at Chicagoland Speedway on June 19–21, but on May 8, NASCAR announced that the event was cancelled.

=== Cultural events ===
In Chicago's South Loop district, light-shows became a regular daily event at 8pm every day by mid-April. The Chicago Marathon set to take place on October 11 was canceled due to public health concerns, following the cancelation of the New York City Marathon and Boston Marathon.

Many summer events in Chicago were canceled, including: Lollapalooza, Chicago House Music Conference and Festival, Chicago Gospel Music Festival, Chicago Blues Festival, Chicago SummerDance, Taste of Chicago, the Chicago Air and Water Show, Chicago Jazz Festival, and most programming at the Chicago Riverwalk, Chicago Cultural Center and Millennium Park. Midwest Furfest, the world's largest furry convention as of 2022, announced its cancellation of its 2020 event on July 15 of that year. The 2021 event occurred in person with attendees required to show proof of vaccination and wear a face mask, regardless if they are wearing a fursuit or not.

In Springfield, Illinois, the majority of the Illinois State Fair was canceled for the first time since World War II. The Fair's youth livestock judging shows were held in September, and the Fair's motor races (Allen Crowe Memorial 100 and Bettenhausen 100) were held in October.

== See also ==
- Timeline of the COVID-19 pandemic in the United States
- COVID-19 pandemic in the United States – for impact on the country
- COVID-19 pandemic – for impact on other countries
