= Joseph Robert Miller =

American serial killer and rapist

- Born: Joseph Robert Tarczon; January 15, 1955 (age 71); Illinois, U.S.
- Other name: Joseph Frank Miller
- Convictions: First degree murder (3 counts); Murder (2 counts)
- Penalty: 15-to-30 years imprisonment (1978); Death; commuted to life imprisonment

Details
- Victims: 5–6+
- Span of crimes: 1976–1993
- Country: United States
- State: Illinois
- Date apprehended: For the final time in October 1993
- Imprisoned at: Dixon Correctional Center, Dixon, Illinois

Joseph Robert Miller (born Joseph Robert Tarczon; January 15, 1955) is an American serial killer and rapist who raped and killed at least six women in Chicago and Peoria, Illinois, from 1977 to 1993. He was convicted of these crimes the following year and sentenced to death, which was later commuted to life imprisonment.

== Biography ==
Joseph Robert Tarczon was born on January 15, 1955, in Illinois, but was abandoned at an orphanage shortly after his birth. A few years later, he was adopted by a married couple from Chicago, the Millers, who changed his surname to match theirs. His adoptive parents proved to be very strict and frequently beat him, leading the young Miller to develop anger issues and engage in petty crime from an early age.

Between the late 1960s and 1977, he was arrested a total of 11 times on charges such as theft, carjacking and sexual assault, but would always get away with a short stint in prison after accepting plea deals from the prosecutors. In the early 1970s, Miller left Chicago and lived in various locations including the cities of Bloomington and Waukegan, and even the state of Virginia. By 1977, he had permanently settled in Skokie, where he had married a local woman and worked as a pizza delivery man.

== First murders and trial ==
On October 25, 1977, 31-year-old convicted sex worker Martha Ryan, also known as Martha E. Kowalski, was reported missing from Chicago. After interviewing witnesses, police learned that Ryan was last seen in the company of an unknown young man driving an orange Chevrolet Vega. Eight days later, her body, which was wrapped up in a blanket, was found in some bushes outside a liquor store in Skokie, not far from Miller's home.

Due to the fact he and his car matched the description of the man last seen in Ryan's company, Miller was brought to the police station for interrogation. On the following day, Skokie police discovered the body of 22-year-old Ann C. Maxham, who had multiple convictions for prostitution. While investigating her killing, officers were approached by a sex worker who claimed to have known the victim, claiming that both Miller and his wife, Marsha, frequently used their services and that she herself had been in their company on several occasions. On the basis of this testimony, Miller was arrested and charged with the two murders on November 5, 1977.

While he was in custody, police obtained a search warrant for Miller's apartment and car, discovering evidence that implicated in an armed robbery in Skokie; a kidnapping in Cook County and aggravated battery in DuPage County. He was also the prime suspect in several other murders dating back to October 1976.

During the subsequent trial, the court established that there had been procedural errors during the search of Miller's arrest and search of his property, with the judge granting a motion by his attorneys to suppress some of the prosecution's evidence. As his wife also refused to testify against him, the Cook County Prosecutor's Office offered a plea deal to Miller. In exchange for dismissing the kidnapping and aggravated battery charges, which could result in the death penalty in combination with the two murder charges, he was allowed to plead guilty to robbery along with the murder charges and be given a lesser sentence. Miller accepted their proposal, and after his conviction, he was sentenced to 30 years imprisonment with a chance of parole after serving 15 years.

== Incarceration, release, and relapse ==
After his conviction, Miller was transferred to serve his sentence at the Illinois River Correctional Center in Canton. During his internment, he participated in sex offender rehabilitation programs and earned a reputation as a model prisoner. In the mid-1980s, he suffered a severe leg injury that left him physically disabled, due to which he was obliged to a disability pension from the state.

After serving the minimum term required, Miller applied for parole. Taking into account his good conduct and his physical condition, he was deemed rehabilitated and his petition was granted. Miller was paroled in April 1993 and, on the advice of the prison chaplain, moved to a nursing home in Peoria. During his stay there, he was considered a friendly, talkative and energetic person who regularly attended church with other residents. In his free time, Miller wandered on the streets of Peoria and sought work as a day laborer for additional financial income.

In late August 1993, he was hired to do some repairs to the home of 88-year-old Bernice Fagotte. A few weeks later, police were informed by a newspaper deliveryman that Fagotte had not picked up her weekly newspaper or her mail for a few weeks. After interviewing neighbors, relatives and acquaintances, the authorities realized that the woman was missing. At around the same time, the bodies of three women were found in a drainage ditch on the outskirts of Peoria, with all of them in various stages of decomposition. Their identities were eventually established as 34-year-old Marcia Logue and 26-year-old Helen Dorrance, whose bodies were found on September 18, and 42-year-old Sandra L. Csesznegi, whose body was found on September 26.

Logue's body was found tied up and gagged, with an autopsy determining that she had been beaten and stabbed multiple times, while Dorrance and Csesznegi were both strangled. All three were residents of Peoria and had been involved in prostitution. Further investigation deduced that Logue was last seen alive on September 15, when she got into a dark maroon-colored car driven by a white man who was about 45 years old. Csesznegi had disappeared on that same day, while Dorrance had vanished four days prior.

On September 23, Fagotte's Oldsmobile was found abandoned in the parking lot of a home near the nursing home where Miller resided. Because of his criminal record, he came under suspicion and was questioned by police on September 29. With his permission, officers were allowed to search his apartment and the interior of his car, whereupon he was taken to the local police station. After detectives read his Miranda rights, the interview began, with Miller claiming that he had nothing to do with any of the crimes. Shortly afterwards, during a search of Fagotte's car, authorities located a knife which had Miller's fingerprints on it. When presented with this, he admitted that it indeed belonged to him, but claimed to have dropped it while driving. Skeptical of his claims, prosecutors later charged Miller with burglary and arrested him in October 1993.

== Trial and imprisonment ==
During the three-month investigation, police uncovered further evidence that implicated Miller in the three murders. A search of his apartment led to the discovery of women's clothes and underwear, as well as sheets with dried blood stains. Police also seized pillows and a mattress covered in reddish-brown stains of dried blood, with similar ones being found on the bedroom wall at the head of the bed. In addition, several strands of female hair and fibers were found around the apartment.

While searching through the Oldsmobile, police found a rug and a knife in the trunk of the car, as well as dried blood stains on the back seat. A witness, a neighbor of Fagotte's named Samuel Voight, positively identified Miller as the repairman he had seen entering her home on August 28. Similarly, a security guard at the nursing home, James McGovern, told investigators that he had seen Miller drive the dark maroon Oldsmobile on two occasions, claiming that it belonged to some friends. Several acquaintances of Miller's also claimed that they had been in the car and that Miller apparently tried to sell it, initially refusing to disclose why. After one of them found Fagotte's social security card in the glove compartment, Miller told him that the car was stolen and he wanted to burn it to cover his tracks.

Glenn Schubert, a forensic examiner, later conclusively proved Miller's guilt in the murders by conducting tests on the seized hair, fibers and personal possessions from the apartment. The results showed that his DNA and genotypic profile matched that of the man who had killed each of the women, based on which he was charged with the murders of Logue, Dorrance and Csesznegi.

Shortly afterwards, Miller's attorneys filed a motion for a change of venue, citing their belief that the publicity surrounding the crimes could lead to their client being unable to receive a fair trial. The motion was granted, and the venue was changed to Springfield. Under pressure from the evidence implicating him in the crimes, Miller initially pleaded guilty, but later changed it to an insanity plea, claiming that he suffered from multiple personality disorder. At the request of his attorneys, he underwent a psychological evaluation which determined that he suffered from dissociative amnesia due to the physical abuse he had suffered as a child. Nevertheless, the jury found no mitigating circumstances in his case and found Miller guilty on all counts, for which he was sentenced to death. Although he was not charged in Fagotte's killing, mostly due to the fact that her body was never found, the police considered him guilty and have officially closed the case.

== Aftermath ==
After his conviction, Miller was transferred to the Menard Correctional Center's death row to await execution. In 2002, citing the numerous miscarriages of justice in death penalty cases, Governor George Ryan imposed a moratorium on the death penalty and commuted all of the inmates' sentences to life imprisonment without parole. The state completely abolished the death penalty in 2011.

In 2004, Miller contacted the Cook County Prosecutor's Office and claimed responsibility for the murders of 18-year-old Valarie Sloan and 25-year-old Stacey Morrison, who had disappeared from Peoria in 1993. He provided authorities with a supposed burial site, but no human remains were located and his confessions were eventually dismissed as bogus. Representatives of the Prosecutor's Office later stated their belief that another offender, Arlie Ray Davis, was the true culprit, and that Miller had confessed simply to bring attention to himself. Nevertheless, he has never been officially ruled out as a suspect in the murders, which remain unsolved.

As of March 2025, Miller is still alive and is currently serving his sentence at the Dixon Correctional Center in Dixon.

== See also ==
- List of serial killers in the United States
