= Ronald Hinton =

American serial killer (born 1972)

- Born: September 17, 1972 (age 54); Chicago, Illinois, U.S.
- Conviction: First-degree murder (x3)
- Penalty: Life imprisonment (x3)

Details
- Victims: 3
- Span of crimes: 1996–1999
- Country: United States
- State: Illinois
- Date apprehended: March 1999

Ronald Hinton (born September 17, 1972) is an American serial killer and rapist who committed the murders of a teenage girl and two women in the Rogers Park neighborhood of Chicago, Illinois, between 1996 and 1999. He pleaded guilty to each murder in 2004 to avoid a death sentence and was subsequently given three life terms.

== Early life ==
Hinton was born on September 17, 1972. A native of Chicago, he was raised by an abusive mother who often beat him and his siblings with a belt constantly under the belief they had been tainted by Satan. Eventually, his mother abandoned the entire family. Growing up Hinton struggled with severe drug addiction, which only got worse as an adult with the death of his son. He eventually fathered a daughter. Before the murders, he led an extensive criminal life with numerous convictions for robbery.

== Murders ==
=== Felicia Mullins ===
On December 6, 1996, Hinton gained entry, either forcefully or was let into the apartment of 17-year-old Felicia Mullins, a girl whom he had a sexual relationship with, in Rogers Park. He attacked Mullins, sexually assaulted, and strangled her to death. He left the apartment not long after, and Mullins' boyfriend found the body hours later. He later flagged down a police cruiser and told officers that he had discovered the dead body of Mullins. Police subsequently saw the body for themselves, and a coroner stated that Mullins, who was also a mother of three, had been murdered via strangulation.

=== Keary Gagnier ===
On August 18, 1998, Hinton and a man named Michael Sanders invaded the third-floor apartment of 36-year-old Keary Lea Gagnier in Rogers Park. Unlike Mullins, neither Hinton nor Sanders had previous relations with the victim. They attacked her in her bedroom, partially stripped her, raped her, and following that Hinton strangled her to death. The duo then took belongings from her apartment, including her ID, and disposed of them in a trash can just outside of the building. Her body was found later on, and city sanitation workers later found her items in the can Hinton threw them in.

=== Merceda Ares ===
On February 13, 1999, Hinton, Sanders, and a man named David Wales broke into the apartment of 31-year-old Merceda Faye Ares. The trio then raped Ares and Hinton then strangled her to death. They then took Ares' belongings, including her bank card and used it to withdraw money from an ATM. Since the trio had used Ares's bankcard, they were spotted on a surveillance camera, and the images the camera captured were broadcast on local TV stations as evidence. Hinton's 3rd grade daughter saw the images and recognized her father's face. She subsequently came forward with the information to her teacher, who reported it to police. Eventually, Hinton, Sanders, and Wales were arrested. DNA evidence left at the crime scene confirmed their guilt in the murder of Ares. It also exposed Hinton and Sanders's involvement in the murder of Gagnier and exposed Hinton in the murder of Mullins.

== Plea and conviction ==
Hinton was charged with all three killings, while Sanders was charged with the two, and Wales was charged in one. In 2003, Wales was convicted for his role in Ares' murder and received a 40-year sentence. Hinton, since he was accused of being the mastermind and the one whose name was being headlined as a serial killer, decided to take a plea deal which allowed him to plead guilty to all counts in order to avoid a death sentence and instead receive multiple life sentences. The judge in the case, James Schreier, agreed to the deal. Schreier had previously dropped the death penalty for another serial killer, Ronald Macon, who also strangled three women in Chicago, though all of his killings occurred in Englewood. Hinton was subsequently given three life sentences without parole. Months later, Sanders was given two life sentences for his involvement.

In October 2023, Wales's sentence was commuted by Governor JB Pritzker to make him eligible for parole, due to concerns about the degree of his guilt. On June 4, 2024, he was released on parole.

As of August 2025, Hinton is incarcerated at Hill Correctional Center, while Sanders is serving his sentences at Stateville Correctional Center.

== See also ==
- List of homicides in Illinois
- List of serial killers in the United States
