= Oak Grove, Illinois =

Oak Grove
- Village
- Location of Oak Grove in Rock Island County, Illinois.

- Location of Illinois in the United States
- Coordinates: 41°24′43″N 90°34′27″W
- Country: United States
- State: Illinois
- County: Rock Island

Area
  - Total: 0.66 sq mi (1.70 km^{2})
  - Land: 0.66 sq mi (1.70 km^{2})
  - Water: 0 sq mi (0.00 km^{2})
- Elevation: 679 ft (207 m)

Population (2020)
  - Total: 476
  - Density: 723.5/sq mi (279.33/km^{2})
- Time zone: UTC-6 (CST)
  - Summer (DST): UTC-5 (CDT)
- Area code: 309
- FIPS code: 17-54703
- GNIS feature ID: 2399534

Oak Grove is a village in Rock Island County, Illinois, United States. The population was 476 at the time of the 2020 census; up from 396 at the 2010 census.

== Geography ==
According to the 2010 census, Oak Grove has a total area of 0.57 square miles (1.48 km^{2}), all land.

== Demographics ==
Historical population
Census	Pop.	Note	%±
1960	888		—
1970	618		−30.4%
1980	695		12.5%
1990	626		−9.9%
2000	220		−64.9%
2010	396		80.0%
2020	476		20.2%
U.S. Decennial Census

The population listed in the 2000 U.S. census mistakenly included the population of the East Moline Correctional Center which is actually located in East Moline apparently mistaking Hillcrest Road in Oak Grove as the road of the same name where the prison is located in East Moline. The actual count for 2000 would be 220 comprising the listed 1,318 less the 1,098 increase to East Moline's population. The U.S. Census Bureau did not adjust the racial and ethnic figures for the 2000 Census listed below.

=== 2020 census ===
Oak Grove village, Illinois – Racial and ethnic composition Note: the US Census treats Hispanic/Latino as an ethnic category. This table excludes Latinos from the racial categories and assigns them to a separate category. Hispanics/Latinos may be of any race.
Race / Ethnicity (NH = Non-Hispanic)	Pop 2000	Pop 2010	Pop 2020	% 2000	% 2010	% 2020
White alone (NH)	442	369	414	33.54%	93.18%	86.97%
Black or African American alone (NH)	761	1	0	57.74%	0.25%	0.00%
Native American or Alaska Native alone (NH)	1	2	0	0.08%	0.51%	0.00%
Asian alone (NH)	0	1	5	0.00%	0.25%	1.05%
Native Hawaiian or Pacific Islander alone (NH)	0	0	1	0.00%	0.00%	0.21%
Other race alone (NH)	0	0	0	0.00%	0.00%	0.00%
Mixed race or Multiracial (NH)	0	5	22	0.00%	1.26%	4.62%
Hispanic or Latino (any race)	114	18	34	8.65%	4.55%	7.14%
Total	1,318	396	476	100.00%	100.00%	100.00%

At the 2000 census there were 1,318 people, 109 households, and 61 families living in the village. The population density was 2,088.2 inhabitants per square mile (806.3/km^{2}). There were 114 housing units at an average density of 180.6 per square mile (69.7/km^{2}). The racial makeup of the village was 34.22% White, 57.74% African American, 0.53% Native American, 0.15% Asian, 7.36% from other races. Hispanic or Latino of any race were 8.65%.

Of the 109 households 23.9% had children under the age of 18 living with them, 33.0% were married couples living together, 13.8% had a female householder with no husband present, and 44.0% were non-families. 35.8% of households were one person and 4.6% were one person aged 65 or older. The average household size was 2.02 and the average family size was 2.49.

The age distribution was 3.2% under the age of 18, 17.7% from 18 to 24, 62.8% from 25 to 44, 14.3% from 45 to 64, and 2.0% 65 or older. The median age was 34 years. For every 100 females, there were 1,120.4 males. For every 100 females age 18 and over, there were 1,437.3 males.

The median household income was $30,833 and the median family income was $36,667. Males had a median income of $12,259 versus $15,000 for females. The per capita income for the village was $15,045. About 10.6% of families and 13.3% of the population were below the poverty line, including 18.2% of those under age 18 and 12.8% of those age 65 or over.

== Education ==
Most of it is in the Sherrard Community Unit School District 200. A portion to the north is in the Rock Island–Milan School District 41.
