= Joliet Treatment Center =

Prison in Illinois, United States

Joliet Treatment Center / Joliet Inpatient Treatment Center
- Interactive map of Joliet Treatment Center / Joliet Inpatient Treatment Center
- Location: 2848 West McDonough Joliet, Illinois; 41°30′45″N 88°9′10″W
- Status: Open
- Security class: Multi-Security
- Capacity: 449 (265 for Treatment Center 168 for Inpatient Treatment Center)
- Opened: 2017
- Managed by: Illinois Department of Corrections
- Director: Catherine Larry

The Joliet Treatment Center (JTC) is a multi-security prison in the Illinois Department of Corrections. Located in Joliet, Illinois, the prison consists of more than twenty buildings and was opened in October 2017. It is the state's largest facility for individuals in custody with severe mental illnesses. The Center includes two "behavior modification units," five residential treatment centers, and a minimum-security unit.

The Joliet Inpatient Treatment Center (JITC) is a separate, 200-bed facility based on the same grounds as the JTC. It provides "the most intensive level of care" for prisoners experiencing mental illness and/or acute and chronic conditions. Since 2023, there have been at least 70 fires at the JITC, including twelve cases where incarcerated people have set themselves on fire. An investigation by local news outlets and The Marshall Project found that two men had died as a result of these fires. A 2024 monitoring report issued by the John Howard Association, a local watchdog organization, reported that men in custody frequently claimed long waits for medical care and had limited out-of-cell time.
