= Vandalia Correctional Center =

Prison in Illinois, United States

Coordinates: 39°00′34″N 89°05′47″W

Vandalia Correctional Institution
- Interactive map of Vandalia Correctional Institution
- Location: US Hwy 51 North Vandalia, Illinois
- Status: medium
- Capacity: 1200
- Opened: 1921
- Managed by: Illinois Department of Corrections

The Vandalia Correctional Institution is a minimum-security state prison for men located in Vandalia, Fayette County, Illinois, owned and operated by the Illinois Department of Corrections.

The facility was first opened in 1921.

In 2011 the prison watchdog group John Howard Association released a report highly critical of conditions at Vandalia. In response prison officials denied the facility was overcrowded, despite 1700 inmates living in a facility approved to hold about 1,100.
