= East Moline, Illinois =

- City
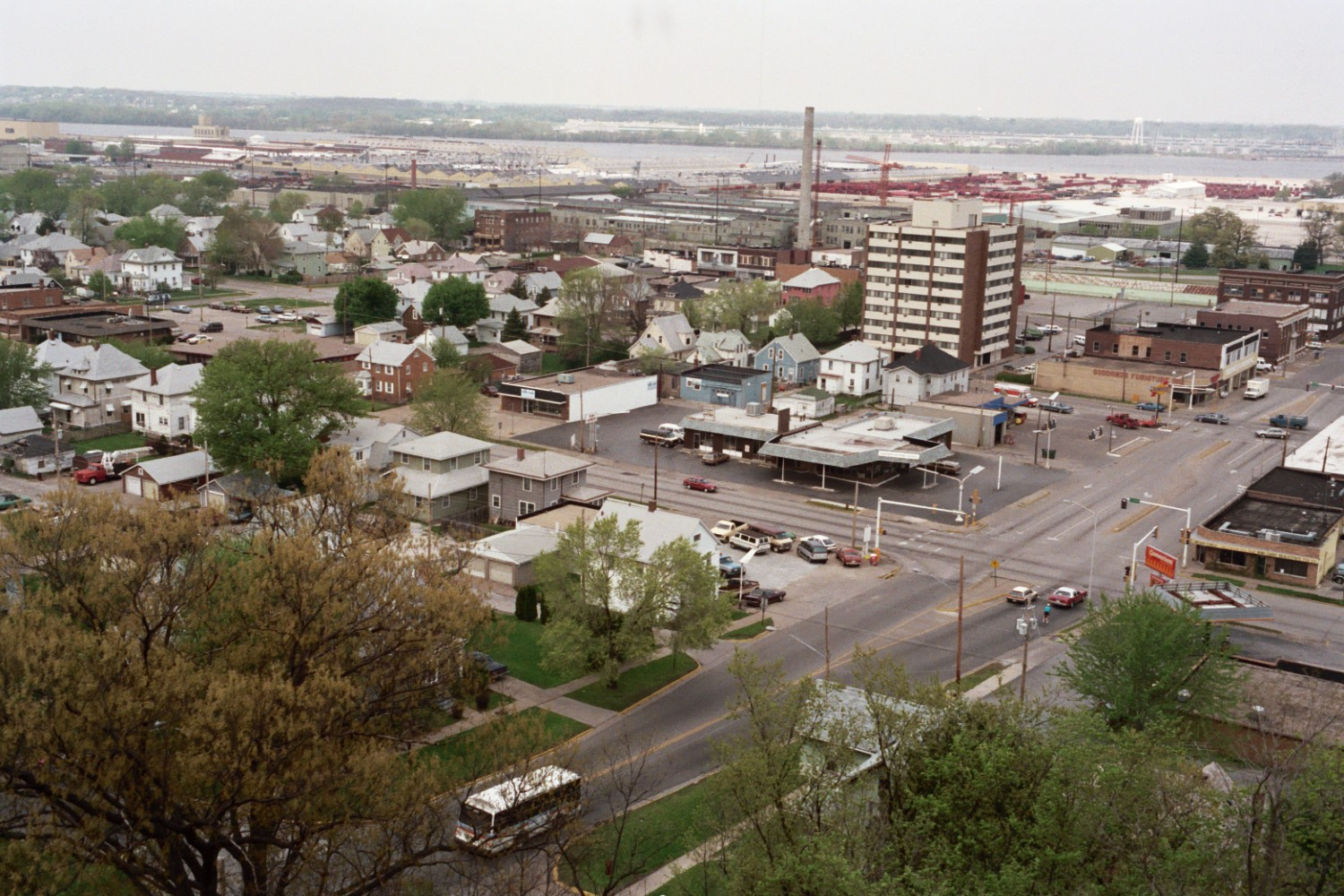
- East Moline in 1991

- Flag
- Interactive map of East Moline, Illinois
- Location within Illinois Location within the United States
- Coordinates: 41°30′40″N 90°23′10″W
- Country: United States
- State: Illinois
- County: Rock Island County
- Incorporated: 1903

Area
  - City: 14.59 sq mi (37.80 km^{2})
  - Land: 14.59 sq mi (37.80 km^{2})
  - Water: 0 sq mi (0.00 km^{2})
- Elevation: 577 ft (176 m)

Population (2020)
  - City: 21,374
  - Density: 1,464.3/sq mi (565.38/km^{2})
  - Metro: 381,342 (134th)
  - CSA: 474,019 (US: 90th)
- Time zone: UTC-6 (CST)
  - Summer (DST): UTC-5 (CDT)
- ZIP code: 61244
- Area codes: 309, 861
- FIPS code: 17-22073
- GNIS feature ID: 2394602
- Interstates: I-74, I-80, I-88, and I-280
- Website: www.eastmoline.com

East Moline is a city in Rock Island County, Illinois, United States. The population was 21,374 at the 2020 census. East Moline was incorporated in April 1907. It is one of the five Quad Cities at the confluence of the Rock and Mississippi rivers, along with neighboring Moline and Rock Island in Illinois and Davenport and Bettendorf in Iowa.

== Geography ==
According to the 2010 census, East Moline has a total area of 14.76 square miles (38.23 km^{2}), all land.

== Arts and Culture ==
East Moline contains part of the Great River Trail (GRT) which runs from Rock Island, Illinois to Savanna, Illinois and is part of the greater Mississippi River Trail (MRT).

Situated along the Great River Trail is one of East Moline's most popular parks: Empire Park. In addition to bike path access, Empire Park contains a wooden playground and 3 pavilions with picnic tables, electricity and charcoal grills.

John Deere Harvester Works is one of the largest combine factories in the world and serves as a tourist attraction with a visitor center and gift shop.

Riverfront revitalization efforts led to the creation of The Bend (also called The Bend Quad Cities community), a 132 acre area containing apartments, a hotel, The Rust Belt Concert Venue, Murphy Park and Band Shell, stores, restaurants, and more. The Rust Belt began as a Moline-Knight Automobile Company and QC Metal Pickling plant but now serves as a concert venue with a capacity of 3,200 and has hosted artists such as Jimmy Eat World, Bon Iver, Anderson East, Hiss Golden Messenger, Low Cut Connie, Rayland Baxter, Lucie Silvas, Illuminati Hotties, Shakey Graves, and Marcy Playground.

== Demographics ==
Historical population
Census	Pop.	Note	%±
1910	2,665		—
1920	8,675		225.5%
1930	10,107		16.5%
1940	12,359		22.3%
1950	13,913		12.6%
1960	16,732		20.3%
1970	20,832		24.5%
1980	20,907		0.4%
1990	20,147		−3.6%
2000	21,431		6.4%
2010	21,302		−0.6%
2020	21,374		0.3%
2022 (est.)	20,874		−2.3%
U.S. Decennial Census; 2010 2020 source

The population listed in the 2000 U.S. census mistakenly excluded the population of the East Moline Correctional Center and listed it as within the village of Oak Grove apparently mistaking Hillcrest Road in Oak Grove as the road of the same name where the prison is located in East Moline. The actual count for 2000 increased from 20,333 to 21,431 after including the prison population of 1,098. The U.S. Census Bureau did not adjust the racial and ethnic figures for the 2000 Census listed below.

=== Racial and ethnic composition ===
East Moline, Illinois – Racial and ethnic composition Note: the US Census treats Hispanic/Latino as an ethnic category. This table excludes Latinos from the racial categories and assigns them to a separate category. Hispanics/Latinos may be of any race.
Race / Ethnicity (NH = Non-Hispanic)	Pop 2000	Pop 2010	Pop 2020	% 2000	% 2010	% 2020
White (NH)	14,979	13,686	11,643	73.67%	64.25%	54.47%
Black or African American (NH)	1,446	2,619	3,776	7.11%	12.29%	17.67%
Native American or Alaska Native (NH)	45	37	29	0.22%	0.17%	0.14%
Asian (NH)	454	422	787	2.23%	1.98%	3.68%
Native Hawaiian or Pacific Islander alone (NH)	1	14	0	0.00%	0.07%	0.00%
Other race alone (NH)	11	24	60	0.05%	0.11%	0.28%
Mixed race or Multiracial (NH)	316	450	816	1.55%	2.11%	3.82%
Hispanic or Latino (any race)	3,081	4,050	4,263	15.15%	19.01%	19.94%
Total	20,333	21,302	21,374	100.00%	100.00%	100.00%

=== 2020 census ===
As of the 2020 census, East Moline had a population of 21,374. The median age was 40.2 years. 22.5% of residents were under the age of 18 and 19.8% of residents were 65 years of age or older. For every 100 females there were 104.3 males, and for every 100 females age 18 and over there were 103.4 males age 18 and over.

99.4% of residents lived in urban areas, while 0.6% lived in rural areas.

There were 8,500 households in East Moline, of which 28.2% had children under the age of 18 living in them. Of all households, 38.5% were married-couple households, 20.8% were households with a male householder and no spouse or partner present, and 34.0% were households with a female householder and no spouse or partner present. About 36.1% of all households were made up of individuals and 16.6% had someone living alone who was 65 years of age or older.

There were 9,276 housing units, of which 8.4% were vacant. The homeowner vacancy rate was 1.9% and the rental vacancy rate was 10.1%.

Racial composition as of the 2020 census
Race	Number	Percent
White	12,620	59.0%
Black or African American	3,869	18.1%
American Indian and Alaska Native	126	0.6%
Asian	801	3.7%
Native Hawaiian and Other Pacific Islander	1	0.0%
Some other race	1,920	9.0%
Two or more races	2,037	9.5%
Hispanic or Latino (of any race)	4,263	19.9%

=== 2000 census ===
As of the United States census taken in 2000, there were 20,333 people, 8,510 households, and 5,369 families living in the city. The population density was 2,254.9 inhabitants per square mile (870.6/km^{2}). There were 8,988 housing units at an average density of 996.7 per square mile (384.8/km^{2}). The racial makeup of the city was 80.04% White, 7.34% African American, 0.35% Native American, 2.25% Asian, 7.47% from other races, and 2.54% from two or more races. Hispanic or Latino of any race were 15.15% of the population.

Of the 8,510 households 29.5% had children under the age of 18 living with them, 45.1% were married couples living together, 13.9% had a female householder with no husband present, and 36.9% were non-families. 32.1% of households were one person and 14.4% were one person aged 65 or older. The average household size was 2.35 and the average family size was 2.97.

The age distribution was 24.7% under the age of 18, 9.4% from 18 to 24, 26.5% from 25 to 44, 22.4% from 45 to 64, and 17.0% 65 or older. The median age was 37 years. For every 100 females, there were 91.4 males. For every 100 females age 18 and over, there were 85.9 males.

The median income for a household in the city was $35,836, and the median family income was $44,695. Males had a median income of $35,263 versus $23,607 for females. The per capita income for the city was $18,245. About 11.6% of families and 13.9% of the population were below the poverty line, including 20.3% of those under age 18 and 7.0% of those age 65 or over.

== Economy ==
=== Top employers ===
According to the city's 2021 Annual Comprehensive Financial Report, the top employers in the city are:

#	Employer	# of Employees
1	John Deere Harvester Works	1,300
2	Illini Hospital	700
3	East Moline Elementary	400
4	East Moline Correctional Center	270
5	Comprehensive Logistics	200
6	United Township High School	175
7	Aramark	150
8	HC Duke and Son	130
9	Aquent, LLC	100
10	Jacobson Warehouse	100

== Education ==
Portions of East Moline are divided between three elementary school districts: East Moline School District 37, Carbon Cliff-Barstow School District 36, and Silvis School District 34. Areas in these three districts are also in the United Township High School District 30. A small portion of East Moline to the East is in a K-12 school district, Riverdale Community Unit School District 100.

East Moline district schools include:

Elementary schools

- Hillcrest Elementary
- Ridgewood Elementary
- Wells Elementary
- Bowlesburg Elementary

Middle schools

- Glenview Middle School

Most of East Moline is zoned to United Township High School.

Special Education schools

- Black Hawk Area Special Education District (BHASED)

== Transportation ==
Quad Cities MetroLINK provides bus service on numerous routes connecting East Moline to destinations across the Quad Cities.

== Notable people ==
- Mike Butcher, MLB pitcher, pitching coach
- Charles F. Carpentier, businessman who served as mayor of East Moline
- Max Hodge, television writer
- Spike O'Dell, radio talk show host for WGN
- Laurdine Patrick, jazz musician who was born in East Moline
