= Vienna Correctional Center =

Minimum-security prison in Illinois

Coordinates: 37°24′20″N 88°46′15″W

Vienna Correctional Institution
- Interactive map of Vienna Correctional Institution
- Location: 6695 State Route 146 East Vienna, Illinois
- Status: medium
- Capacity: 1,963
- Opened: 1965
- Managed by: Illinois Department of Corrections

The Vienna Correctional Institution is a minimum-security state prison for men located in Vienna, Johnson County, Illinois, owned and operated by the Illinois Department of Corrections.

The facility was first opened in 1965 and has a working capacity of 1,963. The facility is adjacent to the state's Shawnee Correctional Center. In 1979 it became the first such institution to become accredited by the American Correctional Association.

In May 2015 the non-profit prison watchdog John Howard Association documented chronic unsafe and unclean conditions in the facility, allegations that supported an inmates' class-action suit seeking to address neglect and overcrowding.
