= Jacksonville Correctional Center =

State Prison

Coordinates: 39°43′37″N 90°10′33″W

- Interactive map of Jacksonville Correctional Center
- Location: 2268 E Morton Avenue Jacksonville, Illinois
- Status: minimum
- Capacity: 1628
- Opened: October, 1984
- Managed by: Illinois Department of Corrections

The Jacksonville Correctional Center is a minimum-security state prison for men located in Jacksonville, Morgan County, Illinois, owned and operated by the Illinois Department of Corrections.

The facility was opened in 1984 and has a capacity of 1628 inmates, a number that includes the associated Greene County Work Camp and Pittsfield Work Camp.
