= Graham Correctional Center =

Prison in Illinois, United States

Coordinates: 39°07′40″N 89°28′24″W

- Interactive map of Graham Correctional Center
- Location: 12078 Route 185 Hillsboro, Illinois
- Status: open
- Security class: medium
- Capacity: 750
- Opened: 1980
- Managed by: Illinois Department of Corrections

Graham Correctional Center is a Level 4 medium-security adult male state prison in Hillsboro, Illinois. The prison opened in 1980 with a capacity of 750 inmates. The current capacity of the prison is 974, though the average daily population is 1,906. The prison's warden is Steve Campbell. Graham Correctional Center consists of 50 buildings located on 117 acres (0.47 km^{2}; 0.183 sq mi). It houses a residential sex offender program and substance abuse treatment as well as vocational and academic classes for prisoners. The facility also houses an Illinois Department of Corrections (IDOC) Reception and Classification Center.

The prison is mentioned in the 2017 John Scalzi science fiction novel The Dispatcher.
