= Shawnee Correctional Center =

Prison in Vienna, Illinois, United States

Coordinates: 37°24′01″N 88°46′32″W

- Interactive map of Shawnee Correctional Center
- Location: 6665 IL-146 Vienna, Illinois
- Status: medium
- Capacity: 2147
- Opened: 1984
- Managed by: Illinois Department of Corrections

The Shawnee Correctional Center is a medium-security state prison for men located to the east of Vienna, Johnson County, Illinois, owned and operated by the Illinois Department of Corrections.

The facility was first opened in 1984, and has a working capacity of 2147. The facility is adjacent to the state's Vienna Correctional Center.

== Notable inmates ==
- Tesfaye Cooper - perpetrator of the 2017 Chicago torture incident hate crime
- Larry Bright - serial killer who murdered eight women
