= Robinson Correctional Center =

Prison in Illinois, United States

Coordinates: 39°01′17″N 87°41′57″W

- Interactive map of Robinson Correctional Center
- Location: 13423 E 1150th Avenue Robinson, Illinois
- Status: minimum
- Capacity: 1223
- Opened: 1991
- Managed by: Illinois Department of Corrections

The Robinson Correctional Institution is a minimum-security (2018) state prison for men located in Robinson, Crawford County, Illinois, owned and operated by the Illinois Department of Corrections.

The facility was first opened in 1991, and has a working capacity of 1223.
