= Taylorville Correctional Center =

Prison in Taylorville, Illinois, United States

Coordinates: 39°30′55″N 89°13′39″W

- Interactive map of Taylorville Correctional Center
- Location: 1144 IL-29 Taylorville, Illinois
- Status: minimum
- Capacity: 1221
- Opened: 1990
- Managed by: Illinois Department of Corrections

The Taylorville Correctional Center is a minimum-security state prison for men located in Taylorville, Christian County, Illinois, owned and operated by the Illinois Department of Corrections.

The facility was first opened in 1990, and has a working capacity of 1221.
