= Centralia Correctional Center =

Prison in Illinois, United States

Coordinates: 38°33′12″N 89°11′31″W

- Interactive map of Centralia Correctional Center
- Location: 9330 Shattuc Road Centralia, Illinois
- Status: medium
- Capacity: 1572
- Opened: 1980
- Managed by: Illinois Department of Corrections

The Centralia Correctional Center is a medium-security state prison for men located in Centralia, Clinton County, Illinois, owned and operated by the Illinois Department of Corrections.

The facility was first opened in 1980, and has a working capacity of 1572.
