= Dixon Correctional Center =

State prison for adult males in Dixon, Illinois

Coordinates: 41.874°N 89.478°W

- Interactive map of Dixon Correctional Center
- Location: 2600 N Brinton Avenue Dixon, Illinois
- Status: Functioning
- Security class: Medium security
- Capacity: 2529
- Opened: 1983
- Managed by: Illinois Department of Corrections

The Dixon Correctional Center is a medium security adult male prison of the Illinois Department of Corrections in Dixon, Illinois. The prison was opened in July 1983 and has an operational capacity of 2,529 prisoners.
