= Illinois River Correctional Center =

State prison

Coordinates: 40°33′24″N 90°04′58″W

Illinois River Correctional Institution
- Interactive map of Illinois River Correctional Institution
- Location: 1300 W Locust Street Canton, Illinois
- Status: Maximum
- Capacity: 2094
- Opened: 1989
- Managed by: Illinois Department of Corrections

The Illinois River Correctional Institution is a maximum-security state prison for men located in Canton, Fulton County, Illinois, owned and operated by the Illinois Department of Corrections.

The facility was first opened in 1989, and has a working capacity of 2094.
