= Sheridan Correctional Center =

Prison in Illinois, United States

Coordinates: 41°31′01″N 88°41′08″W

- Interactive map of Sheridan Correctional Center
- Location: 4017 E 2603rd Road Sheridan, Illinois
- Status: medium
- Capacity: 2104
- Opened: 1941; reopened 2004
- Managed by: Illinois Department of Corrections

The Sheridan Correctional Center is a medium-security state prison for men located in Sheridan, LaSalle County, Illinois, owned and operated by the Illinois Department of Corrections.

The facility runs unique programs for substance abuse and mental health issues.

The extensive grounds (75 buildings on a total of 270 acres) were first opened in 1941 as a juvenile facility. It was run as the "Illinois State Reformatory at Sheridan" from 1949 through 1953, and the "Illinois Industrial School for Boys" from 1953 through 1973.
