= Hill Correctional Center =

Prison in Illinois, United States

Coordinates: 40°56′22″N 90°24′25″W

- Interactive map of Hill Correctional Center
- Location: 600 S Linwood Road Galesburg, Illinois
- Status: Open
- Security class: Medium
- Capacity: 1867
- Opened: 1986
- Managed by: Illinois Department of Corrections

The Hill Correctional Center (HCC) is a medium-security adult male prison of the Illinois Department of Corrections in Galesburg, Illinois. The prison was opened in October 1986 and has an operational capacity of 1,867 prisoners.
