= East Moline Correctional Center =

Prison in Illinois, United States

Coordinates: 41°31′59″N 90°25′11″W

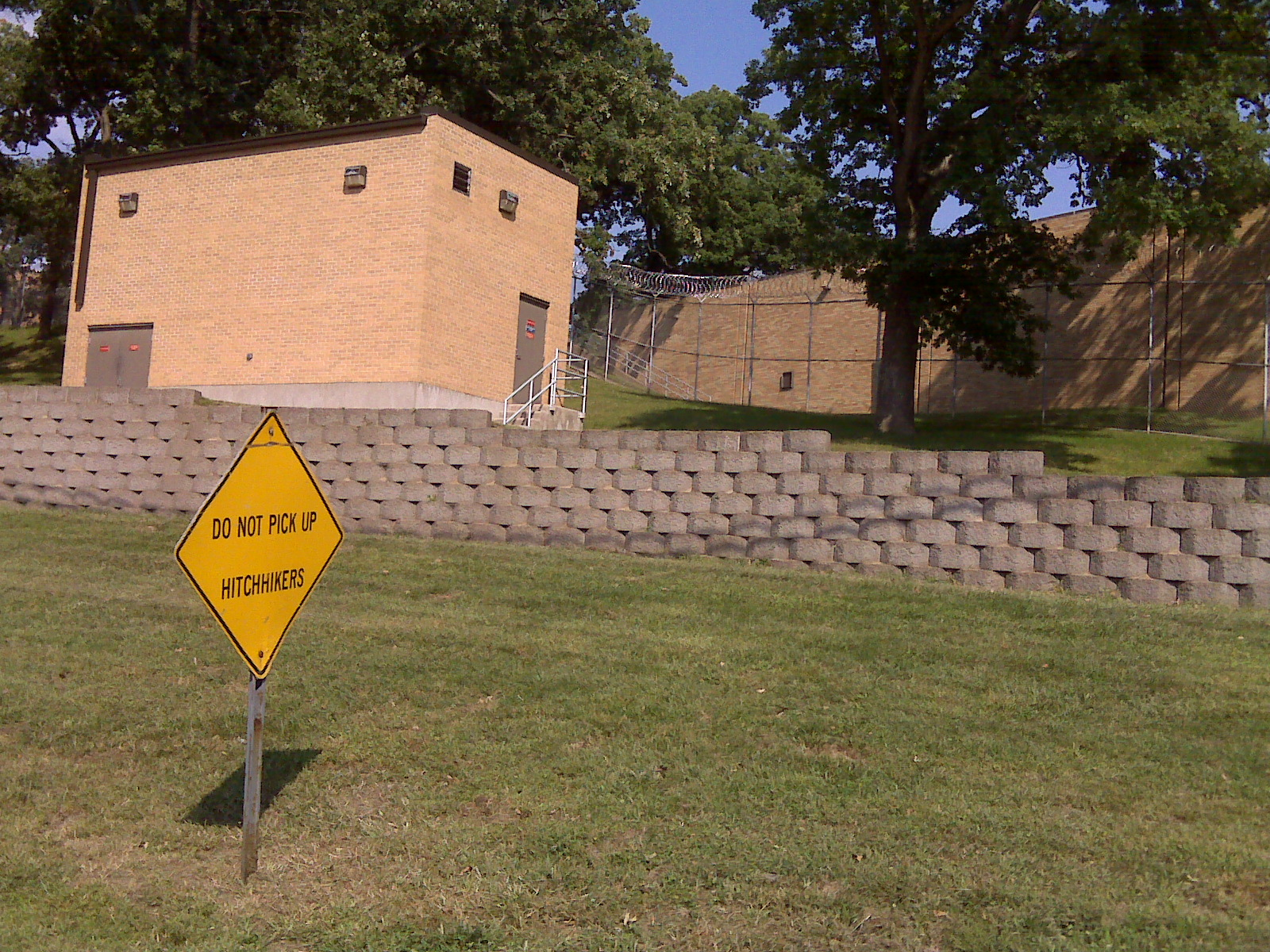
- Interactive map of East Moline Correctional Center
- Location: 100 Hillcrest Road East Moline, Illinois
- Status: minimum
- Capacity: 1452
- Opened: 1980
- Managed by: Illinois Department of Corrections

The East Moline Correctional Center is a minimum-security state prison for men located in East Moline, Rock Island County, Illinois, owned and operated by the Illinois Department of Corrections. The facility was opened in 1980 and has a capacity of 925 inmates, which includes the associated East Moline Work Camp. It has a population of 491 as of 6/30/2023.
