= Illinois Department of Corrections =

Illinois state prison agency

Department of Corrections IDOC
- Illinois Department of Corrections shoulder patch

Jurisdictional structure
- Operations jurisdiction: Illinois, United States
- Illinois Prisons — green=state, red=federal (Hover mouse over pog to popup clickable link)
- Map of Department of Corrections's jurisdiction

Operational structure
- Headquarters: Springfield, Illinois
- Agency executive: John Baldwin, Director of Corrections

Website
- https://www2.illinois.gov/idoc/Pages/default.aspx

The Illinois Department of Corrections (IDOC) is the code department of the Illinois state government that operates the adult state prison system. The IDOC is led by a director appointed by the Governor of Illinois, and its headquarters are in Springfield.

The IDOC was established in 1970, combining the state's prisons, juvenile centers, and parole services. The juvenile corrections system was split off into the Illinois Department of Juvenile Justice on July 1, 2006.

== Facilities ==
Name	Highest security	Operational capacity
Menard Correctional Center	1 – Maximum	3,205
Pontiac Correctional Center	1 – Maximum	1,492
Stateville Correctional Center	1 – Maximum	1,648
Northern Reception and Classification (NRC)	1 – Maximum	1,625
Joliet Treatment Center	1 – Maximum	334
Dixon Correctional Center	1 – Maximum (X-House Psychiatric); 3 – High Medium (Main/SMC); 5 – High Minimum (Dorm Units)	2,529
Hill Correctional Center	2 – Secure Medium	1,867
Lawrence Correctional Center	2 – Maximum	2,320
Pinckneyville Correctional Center	2 – Secure Medium	2,274
Western Illinois Correctional Center	2 – Secure Medium	1,871
Big Muddy River Correctional Center	3 – High Medium	1,598
Danville Correctional Center	3 – High Medium	1,864
Illinois River Correctional Center	3 – High Medium	2,094
Menard Medium Security Unit	3 – High Medium	441
Pontiac Medium Security Unit	3 – High Medium	488
Shawnee Correctional Center	3 – High Medium	2,147
Centralia Correctional Center	4 – Medium	1,528
Decatur Correctional Center	4 – Medium	790
Graham Correctional Center	4 – Medium	2,012
Lincoln Correctional Center	4 – Medium	1,019
Logan Correctional Center	4 – Medium	2,019
Sheridan Correctional Center	4 – Medium	2,104
Jacksonville Correctional Center	5 – High Minimum	1,012
Robinson Correctional Center	5 – High Minimum	1,223
Taylorville Correctional Center	5 – High Minimum	1,221
East Moline Correctional Center	6 – Minimum	1,228
Southwestern Illinois Correctional Center	6 – Minimum	621
Vandalia Correctional Center	6 – Minimum	1,700
Vienna Correctional Center	6 – Minimum	1,616
Clayton Work Camp	7 – Low Minimum	143
Dixon Springs Impact Incarceration Program	7 – Low Minimum	152
DuQuoin Impact Incarceration Program	7 – Low Minimum	172
East Moline Work Camps 1 and 2	7 – Low Minimum	184
Greene County Work Camp	7 – Low Minimum	158
Pittsfield Work Camp	7 – Low Minimum	267
Southwestern Illinois Work Camp	7 – Low Minimum	100
Stateville Minimum Security Unit	7 – Low Minimum	185
Crossroads Adult Transition Center	8 – Transitional	364
Fox Valley Adult Transition Center	8 – Transitional	130
North Lawndale Adult Transition Center	8 – Transitional	200
Peoria Adult Transition Center	8 – Transitional	248

Crossroads and North Lawndale Adult Transition Centers are operated by the Safer Foundation.

=== Closed prisons ===
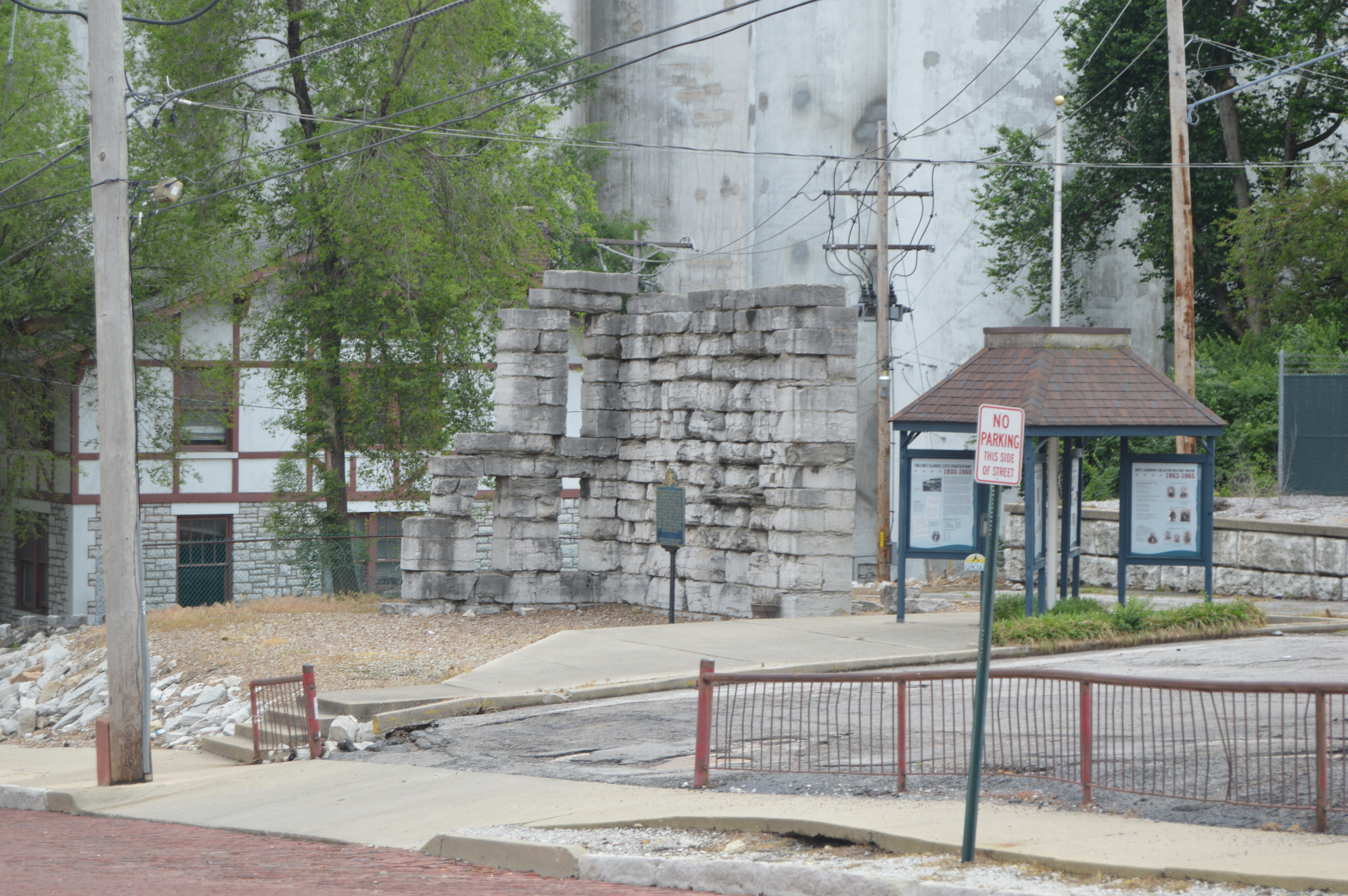
Remains of the old Illinois State Prison, the first state penitentiary in Illinois

- Alton Military Prison: open 1833 through 1857, replaced by Joliet; operated as a military prison during the Civil War
- Decatur Adult Transition Center; closed 2012
- Dwight Correctional Center: closed in 2013; maximum security
- Hardin County Work Camp; closed 2015; low minimum
- Jesse 'Ma' Houston Adult Transition Center: closed 2011; transitional facility
- Joliet Prison: closed in 2002; 2.5 miles (4.0 km) south of Stateville Correctional Center
- Kankakee Minimum-Security Unit; low minimum, closed 2010
- Southern Illinois Adult Transition Center; closed 2012
- Tamms Correctional Center: closed in 2013; maximum security
  - Tamms Minimum Security Unit: low minimum
- Thomson Correctional Center, a maximum security facility built in 2001 near Thomson, Illinois, was sold by the state to the federal government in 2012, and was subsequently renamed the Administrative United States Penitentiary, Thomson (AUSP Thomson). In January 2019, the prison facility was fully activated by the Federal Bureau of Prisons. In March 2020, the prison facility was renamed the United States Penitentiary, Thomson (USP Thomson).

=== Security levels ===
The Illinois Department of Corrections uses a three level security designation system that encompasses three points of data. The initial classification is performed at one of the reception facilities located throughout the state. Classification reviews are performed periodically on offenders at their assigned facilities. The primary points of data are security level, offender grade, and escape level. Within each security level there are additional specifics that separate each security level into additional levels.

Security Levels: 1 – Maximum, 2 – Medium, 3 – Minimum, P – Pending (Reception/Classification Status)

Offender Grades: A, B, C

Escape Level: (L)ow, (M)oderate, (H)igh, (E)xtremely High, (P)ending (Reception/Classification Status)

The offender classification is designated in the example below:

2 (Security Level); A (Offender Grade); L (Escape Risk Level)

Within the Medium and Minimum security levels there are multiple levels of security as shown in the list of facilities above. There are several factors which determine the level of security at a facility level. A table below will highlight some of the most important distinctions. An offender can be housed at a facility one level lower than his current security classification for a limited period of time if located in the Segregation Unit while a transfer is pending after reclassification.

Offender grades are part of the discipline system utilized within the facilities. Offenders are initially assigned to A grade and afforded all privileges. B grade is a transitional grade for offenders moving back to A grade after demotion to C grade. C grade restricts telephone usage, commissary purchases to cosmetic/legal items, and prohibits many work and school assignments.

The escape risk system utilizes a metric to indicate the likelihood that an offender would attempt escape. Several factors are used to determine this metric including but not limited to crime of conviction, criminal history, history of escape attempts, and outstanding warrants. An oddity within the Moderate Escape Risk designation should be noted. This escape level is used for two completely different purposes. In one case this level is assigned to offenders who would otherwise be a low risk when placed in a higher security facility. For example, Dixon Correctional Center houses the majority of offenders with serious health problems. Offenders serving long sentences who are moved to this Level 3 facility will usually be assigned the moderate escape risk level as part of the reclassification performed to assign an offender with medical problems to this facility where they would otherwise remain at Level 1/2. The other use for this escape level is where an offender has an outstanding warrant or has absconded from parole or work release during the last 24 months. Offender identification cards indicate the escape level by utilizing a color coded background. Low escape risks have a white background, moderate escape risks have a blue background, high escape risks have a red background, and extremely high escape risks have a green background. Additionally, extremely high escape risks wear a green shirt and have a green stripe down their pant legs.

Offenders with special security clearances, such as outside clearance, special assignment clearances, or multi-level facility indicators (SMC for example at Dixon) will have data on the back of their offender identification cards.

Facility Level	Security Features	Eligible Security Classifications	Notes
1	Very Strong Perimeter, Majority of Offenders Housed in Cells, Guard Towers, Limited Movement No Day Room	All Levels, Grades, and Escape Risks	A limited group of offenders are granted OUTSIDE CLEARANCE to work outside the perimeter for certain tasks. These offenders must be designated 3AL and have an in depth security analysis performed to be eligible. Certain crimes would preclude an offender from ever attaining this designation. Stateville Correctional Center utilizes Stateville Minimum Security Unit attached to the Northern Reception and Classification Center on the Stateville Campus (also a Level 1 facility) to house these offenders. Pontiac Correctional Center utilizes the Pontiac Medium Security Unit to house these offenders. Menard Correctional Center utilizes the Menard Medium Security Unit to house these offenders.
2	Very Strong Perimeter, Offenders Housed in Cells, Guard Towers, Escorted Controlled Movement Limited Day Room Time (21 hours in cell, 3 hours out)	Security Levels 2 and 3, All Grades, Escape Levels L, M, H	A limited group of offenders are granted OUTSIDE CLEARANCE to work outside the perimeter for certain tasks. These offenders must be designated 3AL and have an in depth security analysis performed to be eligible. Certain crimes would preclude an offender from ever attaining this designation.
3	Very Secure Perimeter, Offenders Housed in Cells, Guard Towers, Controlled Movement (pass system) Day Room Time (18 hours in cell, 6 hours out) (all except Dixon and Pontiac MSU) Day Room Time (After breakfast until 10:00pm except count periods) (excluding Dixon Reception which is 18/6) and Pontiac MSU)	Security Levels 2 and 3, All Grades, Escape Levels L, M	A limited group of offenders are granted OUTSIDE CLEARANCE to work outside the perimeter for certain tasks. These offenders must be designated 3AL and have an in depth security analysis performed to be eligible. Certain crimes would preclude an offender from ever attaining this designation.
4	Very Secure Perimeter, Offenders Housed in Cells, Guard Towers, Controlled Movement (pass system) Day Room Time (After breakfast until 10:00pm except count periods)	Security Levels 2 and 3, All Grades, Escape Level L (there are limited exceptions for offenders assigned to Escape Level M)	A limited group of offenders are granted OUTSIDE CLEARANCE to work outside the perimeter for certain tasks. These offenders must be designated 3AL and have an in depth security analysis performed to be eligible. Certain crimes would preclude an offender from ever attaining this designation.
5	Secure Perimeter, Offenders Housed in Dorms, Guard Tower, Controlled Movement (pass system) Day Room Time (After breakfast until 10:00pm except count periods)	Security Level 3, All Grades, Escape Level L (there are limited exceptions for offenders assigned to Escape Level M)	A limited group of offenders are granted OUTSIDE CLEARANCE to work outside the perimeter for certain tasks. These offenders must be designated 3AL and have an in depth security analysis performed to be eligible. Certain crimes would preclude an offender from ever attaining this designation.
6	Secure Perimeter, Offenders Housed in Dorms, Controlled Movement (pass system) Day Room Time (After breakfast until 10:00pm except count periods)	Security Level 3, Grades A and B, Escape Level L	A limited group of offenders are granted OUTSIDE CLEARANCE to work outside the perimeter for certain tasks. These offenders must be designated 3AL and have an in depth security analysis performed to be eligible. Certain crimes would preclude an offender from ever attaining this designation. No sex offenders may be housed at this level.
7	Minimal Unlocked Perimeter, Offenders Housed in Dorms, Open Movement (with certain controls) Day Room Time (After breakfast until 10:00pm except count periods)	Security Level 3, A Grade Only, Escape Level L	All offenders at this level would be considered as having OUTSIDE CLEARANCE as a matter of security designation and be allowed to work on supervised crews in the community. These offenders must be designated 3AL and have an in depth security analysis performed to be eligible. Certain crimes would preclude an offender from ever attaining this designation. This classification also applies to all offenders assigned to the Impact Incarceration Program. No sex offenders may be housed at this level.
8	No Perimeter, Offenders Housed in Dorms, Work Release Setting	Security Level 3, A Grade Only, Escape Level L	This designation is for work release transitional facilities. These offenders are integrated within the community in a highly controlled and supervised manner. This designation is similar to parole with the exception that periodic custody is still retained and the level of supervision is much higher. No sex offenders may be housed at this level.

== Death row ==
Illinois had the death penalty until it was abolished in 2011. The last man executed in Illinois was Ripper Crew member Andrew Kokoraleis on March 17, 1999.

Pontiac Correctional Center housed the male death row, while Dwight Correctional Center housed the female death row. Prior to the January 11, 2003, commutation of death row sentences, male death row offenders were housed at the Menard, Pontiac, and Tamms correctional centers. The execution chamber was located at the Tamms Correctional Center. Previously, inmates had been executed at the Stateville Correctional Center. In March 1998, the site of executions was moved from the Stateville Correctional Center in Crest Hill, Illinois to the Tamms Correctional Center in Tamms, Illinois.

== See also ==
- List of law enforcement agencies in Illinois
- List of United States state correction agencies
- List of U.S. state prisons
- Dwight Correctional Center
