= Lee Township, Iowa =

Lee Township is the name of some places in the U.S. state of Iowa:

- Lee Township, Adair County, Iowa
- Lee Township, Buena Vista County, Iowa
- Lee Township, Franklin County, Iowa
- Lee Township, Madison County, Iowa
- Lee Township, Polk County, Iowa

== See also ==
- Lee Township (disambiguation)
