= Brown County High School (Illinois) =

Public school in Mt. Sterling, Illinois, US

Location
- 500 East Main Street; Mt. Sterling, Brown County, Illinois 62353; United States; 39.983°N 90.752°W

Information
- Type: Comprehensive Public High School
- Motto: Sting Strong
- School district: Brown County Community Unit School District 1
- Principal: Pollee Craven
- Grades: 9–12
- Enrollment: 215 (2023–2024)
- Student to teacher ratio: 9:1
- Campus type: large city
- Colors: Kelly Green, White, Gold
- Athletics conference: Western Illinois Valley
- Team name: Hornets
- Newspaper: The Stinger
- Yearbook: Rambler
- Website: bchs.bchornets.com

Brown County High School, or BCHS, is a public four-year high school located at 500 East Main Street in Mount Sterling, Illinois, a small city in Brown County, Illinois, in the Midwestern United States. BCHS serves the communities of Mount Sterling, Ripley, Timewell, and Versailles. The campus is located 40 miles (64 km) east of Quincy, Illinois, and serves a mixed small city, village, and rural residential community.

== Athletics ==
Brown County High School mascot

Brown County High School competes in the Western Illinois Valley Conference and is a member school in the Illinois High School Association. Their mascot is the Hornets, with school colors of kelly green, white, and gold. The school has no state championships on record in team athletics and activities and had a football state championship appearance in 2025.

== History ==
Brown County High School was formed out of Mount Sterling High School in 1947. Surrounding communities may have also possessed high schools at some time which were consolidated into the current BCHS. Potential reference/citation:
