= Lee Township =

Lee Township may refer to:

== Canada ==
- Lee Township, Ontario

== Arkansas ==
- Lee Township, Boone County, Arkansas
- Lee Township, Cleveland County, Arkansas, in Cleveland County, Arkansas
- Lee Township, Johnson County, Arkansas, in Johnson County, Arkansas
- Lee Township, Pope County, Arkansas

== California ==
- Lee Township, a former civil township in Sacramento County, California

== Illinois ==
- Lee Township, Brown County, Illinois
- Lee Township, Fulton County, Illinois

== Iowa ==
- Lee Township, Adair County, Iowa
- Lee Township, Buena Vista County, Iowa
- Lee Township, Franklin County, Iowa
- Lee Township, Madison County, Iowa
- Lee Township, Polk County, Iowa

== Michigan ==
- Lee Township, Allegan County, Michigan
- Lee Township, Calhoun County, Michigan
- Lee Township, Midland County, Michigan

== Minnesota ==
- Lee Township, Aitkin County, Minnesota
- Lee Township, Beltrami County, Minnesota
- Lee Township, Norman County, Minnesota

== Missouri ==
- Lee Township, Platte County, Missouri

== North Dakota ==
- Lee Township, Nelson County, North Dakota, in Nelson County, North Dakota

== Ohio ==
- Lee Township, Athens County, Ohio
- Lee Township, Carroll County, Ohio
- Lee Township, Monroe County, Ohio

== South Dakota ==
- Lee Township, Roberts County, South Dakota, in Roberts County, South Dakota
