= Cooperstown Township, Brown County, Illinois =

Cooperstown Township
- Township
- Location in Brown County

- Brown County's location in Illinois
- Coordinates: 39°57′48″N 90°36′55″W
- Country: United States
- State: Illinois
- County: Brown
- Established: November 8, 1853

Area
  - Total: 41.45 sq mi (107.4 km^{2})
  - Land: 40.67 sq mi (105.3 km^{2})
  - Water: 0.78 sq mi (2.0 km^{2}) 1.88%
- Elevation: 627 ft (191 m)

Population (2020)
  - Total: 264
  - Density: 6.49/sq mi (2.51/km^{2})
- Time zone: UTC-6 (CST)
  - Summer (DST): UTC-5 (CDT)
- ZIP codes: 62353, 62378
- FIPS code: 17-009-16262

Cooperstown Township is one of nine townships in Brown County, Illinois, USA. As of the 2020 census, its population was 264 and it contained 142 housing units.

== Geography ==
According to the 2010 census, the township has a total area of 41.45 square miles (107.4 km^{2}), of which 40.67 square miles (105.3 km^{2}) (or 98.12%) is land and 0.78 square miles (2.0 km^{2}) (or 1.88%) is water.

=== Unincorporated towns ===
- Cooperstown
- La Grange

=== Cemeteries ===
The township contains these eleven cemeteries: Cooperstown, Cross Roads, De Witt, Elias Clark, Huffman, Hulett, Logan Creek, Logsdon Number 1, Logsdon Number 2, Perry and Tebo Burial Ground.

=== Major highways ===
- US Route 24

=== Lakes ===
- Big Lake

== Demographics ==
As of the 2020 census there were 264 people, 170 households, and 107 families residing in the township. The population density was 6.37 inhabitants per square mile (2.46/km^{2}). There were 142 housing units at an average density of 3.43 per square mile (1.32/km^{2}). The racial makeup of the township was 94.70% White, 0.00% African American, 0.38% Native American, 0.76% Asian, 0.00% Pacific Islander, 0.00% from other races, and 4.17% from two or more races. Hispanic or Latino of any race were 1.52% of the population.

There were 170 households, out of which 9.40% had children under the age of 18 living with them, 62.94% were married couples living together, 0.00% had a female householder with no spouse present, and 37.06% were non-families. 21.20% of all households were made up of individuals, and 21.20% had someone living alone who was 65 years of age or older. The average household size was 2.45 and the average family size was 3.10.

The township's age distribution consisted of 17.3% under the age of 18, 4.6% from 18 to 24, 2.2% from 25 to 44, 49.1% from 45 to 64, and 26.9% who were 65 years of age or older. The median age was 58.2 years. For every 100 females, there were 63.5 males. For every 100 females age 18 and over, there were 71.6 males.

The median income for a household in the township was $78,750, and the median income for a family was $101,641. Males had a median income of $42,917 versus $36,625 for females. The per capita income for the township was $34,185. No families and approximately 7.4% of the population were below the poverty line, including none of those under age 18 and 11.6% of those age 65 or over.

Historical population
Census	Pop.	Note	%±
2010	311		—
2020	264		−15.1%
U.S. Decennial Census

== School districts ==
- Brown County Community Unit School District 1

== Political districts ==
- Illinois' 18th congressional district
- State House District 93
- State Senate District 47
