= Lee Township, Illinois =

Lee Township may refer to one of the following places in the State of Illinois:

- Lee Township, Brown County, Illinois
- Lee Township, Fulton County, Illinois

See also

- Lee Township (disambiguation)
