= Mount Sterling Township, Brown County, Illinois =

Mount Sterling Township
- Township
- Location in Brown County

- Brown County's location in Illinois
- Coordinates: 39°58′22″N 90°44′54″W
- Country: United States
- State: Illinois
- County: Brown
- Established: November 8, 1853

Area
  - Total: 37.24 sq mi (96.5 km^{2})
  - Land: 37.19 sq mi (96.3 km^{2})
  - Water: 0.06 sq mi (0.16 km^{2}) 0.16%
- Elevation: 705 ft (215 m)

Population (2020)
  - Total: 4,297
  - Density: 115.5/sq mi (44.61/km^{2})
- Time zone: UTC-6 (CST)
  - Summer (DST): UTC-5 (CDT)
- ZIP codes: 62353, 62378
- FIPS code: 17-009-51167

Mount Sterling Township is one of nine townships in Brown County, Illinois, USA. As of the 2020 census, its population was 4,297 and it contained 1,268 housing units.

== Geography ==
According to the 2010 census, the township has a total area of 37.24 square miles (96.5 km^{2}), of which 37.19 square miles (96.3 km^{2}) (or 99.87%) is land and 0.06 square miles (0.16 km^{2}) (or 0.16%) is water.

=== Cities ===
- Mount Sterling

=== Unincorporated towns ===
- Hersman

(This list is based on USGS data and may include former settlements.)

=== Cemeteries ===
The township contains these ten cemeteries: Greenwell, Harbour, Hersman, Icabod Perry, Keifer, Means, Mount Sterling Catholic, Mount Sterling City, Putnam and Wilson.

=== Major highways ===
- US Route 24
- Illinois Route 99
- Illinois Route 107

=== Landmarks ===
- Fairground

== Demographics ==
As of the 2020 census there were 4,297 people, 1,105 households, and 597 families residing in the township. The population density was 115.37 inhabitants per square mile (44.54/km^{2}). There were 1,268 housing units at an average density of 34.04 per square mile (13.14/km^{2}). The racial makeup of the township was 67.74% White, 24.46% African American, 0.12% Native American, 0.12% Asian, 0.00% Pacific Islander, 4.86% from other races, and 2.70% from two or more races. Hispanic or Latino of any race were 6.21% of the population.

There were 1,105 households, out of which 26.20% had children under the age of 18 living with them, 41.18% were married couples living together, 11.76% had a female householder with no spouse present, and 45.97% were non-families. 38.20% of all households were made up of individuals, and 13.00% had someone living alone who was 65 years of age or older. The average household size was 2.26 and the average family size was 3.04.

The township's age distribution consisted of 15.6% under the age of 18, 10.9% from 18 to 24, 37.9% from 25 to 44, 25.1% from 45 to 64, and 10.6% who were 65 years of age or older. The median age was 36.3 years. For every 100 females, there were 244.3 males. For every 100 females age 18 and over, there were 267.3 males.

The median income for a household in the township was $55,464, and the median income for a family was $77,198. Males had a median income of $42,930 versus $33,094 for females. The per capita income for the township was $17,193. About 5.2% of families and 11.0% of the population were below the poverty line, including 11.4% of those under age 18 and 5.7% of those age 65 or over.

Historical population
Census	Pop.	Note	%±
2010	4,673		—
2020	4,297		−8.0%
U.S. Decennial Census

== School districts ==
- Brown County Community Unit School District 1

== Political districts ==
- Illinois's 18th congressional district
- State House District 93
- State Senate District 47
