= Spring Valley, Adams County, Illinois =

Spring Valley, Illinois
- Unincorporated town
- Location within Illinois Location within the United States
- Coordinates: 39°53′48″N 90°58′43″W
- Country: United States
- State: Illinois
- County: Adams
- Elevation: 604 ft (184 m)
- Time zone: UTC-6 (Central (CST))
  - Summer (DST): UTC-5 (CDT)
- Area code: 217
- GNIS feature ID: 1785353

Spring Valley is a defunct town once located in McKee Township, Adams County, Illinois, United States, east of Liberty and west of Siloam Springs State Park. It acquired this name from a previous town on the site, and once was home to a blacksmith and several other businesses. At the outbreak of the Civil War, however, the proprietors left to join the army, and the town failed. In later years it became the site of a school and a United Brethren church.
