= Chestline, Illinois =

- Unincorporated community
- Location within Illinois Location within the United States
- Coordinates: 39°50′41″N 90°57′35″W
- Country: United States
- State: Illinois
- County: Adams
- Elevation: 715 ft (218 m)
- Time zone: UTC-6 (Central (CST))
  - Summer (DST): UTC-5 (CDT)
- Area code: 217
- GNIS feature ID: 422546

Chestline is an unincorporated community in Beverly and McKee Township Townships, Adams County, Illinois, United States. Chestline is southeast of Liberty.

A post office called Chestline was established in 1882, and remained in operation until 1906. According to tradition, a grove of chestnut trees near the original town site accounts for the name.
