= Pea Ridge Township, Brown County, Illinois =

Pea Ridge Township
- Township
- Location in Brown County

- Brown County's location in Illinois
- Coordinates: 40°03′38″N 90°50′52″W
- Country: United States
- State: Illinois
- County: Brown
- Established: November 8, 1853

Area
  - Total: 37.31 sq mi (96.6 km^{2})
  - Land: 37.31 sq mi (96.6 km^{2})
  - Water: 0 sq mi (0 km^{2}) 0%
- Elevation: 590 ft (180 m)

Population (2020)
  - Total: 163
  - Density: 4.37/sq mi (1.69/km^{2})
- Time zone: UTC-6 (CST)
  - Summer (DST): UTC-5 (CDT)
- ZIP codes: 62324, 62353, 62375
- FIPS code: 17-009-58330

Pea Ridge Township is one of nine townships in Brown County, Illinois, USA. As of the 2020 census, its population was 163 and it contained 89 housing units.

== Geography ==
According to the 2010 census, the township has a total area of 37.31 square miles (96.6 km^{2}), all land.

=== Unincorporated towns ===
- Damon

(This list is based on USGS data and may include former settlements.)

=== Cemeteries ===
The township contains these five cemeteries: Becam, Gristy, Knight, Mounds and Reynolds.

=== Major highways ===
- US Route 24

=== Airports and landing strips ===
- Herren Airport

== Demographics ==
As of the 2020 census there were 163 people, 24 households, and 19 families residing in the township. The population density was 4.37 inhabitants per square mile (1.69/km^{2}). There were 89 housing units at an average density of 2.38 per square mile (0.92/km^{2}). The racial makeup of the township was 98.16% White, 0.00% African American, 0.00% Native American, 0.61% Asian, 0.00% Pacific Islander, 0.00% from other races, and 1.23% from two or more races. Hispanic or Latino of any race were 0.61% of the population.

There were 24 households, out of which 45.80% had children under the age of 18 living with them, 79.17% were married couples living together, 0.00% had a female householder with no spouse present, and 20.83% were non-families. 20.80% of all households were made up of individuals, and 20.80% had someone living alone who was 65 years of age or older. The average household size was 2.71 and the average family size was 3.16.

The township's age distribution consisted of 33.8% under the age of 18, 0.0% from 18 to 24, 23.1% from 25 to 44, 15.4% from 45 to 64, and 27.7% who were 65 years of age or older. The median age was 41.0 years. For every 100 females, there were 209.5 males. For every 100 females age 18 and over, there were 104.8 males.

The per capita income for the township was $24,598. About 0.0% of families and 7.7% of the population were below the poverty line, including 0.0% of those under age 18 and 27.8% of those age 65 or over.

Historical population
Census	Pop.	Note	%±
2010	188		—
2020	163		−13.3%
U.S. Decennial Census

== School districts ==
- Brown County Community Unit School District 1
- Southeastern Community Unit School District 337

== Political districts ==
- Illinois' 18th congressional district
- State House District 93
- State Senate District 47
