= Buckhorn Township, Brown County, Illinois =

Buckhorn Township
- Township
- Location in Brown County

- Brown County's location in Illinois
- Coordinates: 39°53′06″N 90°51′28″W
- Country: United States
- State: Illinois
- County: Brown
- Established: November 8, 1853

Area
  - Total: 37.95 sq mi (98.3 km^{2})
  - Land: 37.86 sq mi (98.1 km^{2})
  - Water: 0.08 sq mi (0.21 km^{2}) 0.21%
- Elevation: 630 ft (192 m)

Population (2020)
  - Total: 102
  - Density: 2.69/sq mi (1.04/km^{2})
- Time zone: UTC-6 (CST)
  - Summer (DST): UTC-5 (CDT)
- ZIP codes: 62314, 62353, 62375
- FIPS code: 17-009-09291

Buckhorn Township is one of nine townships in Brown County, Illinois, USA. As of the 2020 census, its population was 102 and it contained 54 housing units.

== Geography ==
According to the 2010 census, the township has a total area of 37.95 square miles (98.3 km^{2}), of which 37.86 square miles (98.1 km^{2}) (or 99.76%) is land and 0.08 square miles (0.21 km^{2}) (or 0.21%) is water.

=== Unincorporated towns ===
- Benville
- Morrelville
- Siloam
- White Oak Springs (historical)

(This list is based on USGS data and may include former settlements.)

=== Cemeteries ===
The township contains these eight cemeteries: Benville, Bixler, Bowman, Butler, DeHart, Dobey, Linn and Morrelville.

=== Landmarks ===
- Siloam Springs State Park

== Demographics ==
As of the 2020 census there were 102 people, 98 households, and 89 families residing in the township. The population density was 2.68 inhabitants per square mile (1.03/km^{2}). There were 54 housing units at an average density of 1.42 per square mile (0.55/km^{2}). The racial makeup of the township was 96.08% White, 0.00% African American, 0.00% Native American, 0.98% Asian, 0.00% Pacific Islander, 0.00% from other races, and 2.94% from two or more races. Hispanic or Latino of any race were 0.98% of the population.

There were 98 households, out of which 16.30% had children under the age of 18 living with them, 76.53% were married couples living together, none had a female householder with no spouse present, and 9.18% were non-families. 9.20% of all households were made up of individuals, and 9.20% had someone living alone who was 65 years of age or older. The average household size was 3.12 and the average family size was 3.34.

The township's age distribution consisted of 20.6% under the age of 18, 10.5% from 18 to 24, 20.5% from 25 to 44, 36.6% from 45 to 64, and 11.8% who were 65 years of age or older. The median age was 41.2 years. For every 100 females, there were 120.1 males. For every 100 females age 18 and over, there were 94.4 males.

The median income for a household in the township was $116,047, and the median income for a family was $116,308. Males had a median income of $45,417 versus $25,959 for females. The per capita income for the township was $33,073. None of the population was below the poverty line.

Historical population
Census	Pop.	Note	%±
2010	98		—
2020	102		4.1%
U.S. Decennial Census

== School districts ==
- Brown County Community Unit School District 1

== Political districts ==
- Illinois' 18th congressional district
- State House District 93
- State Senate District 47
