= White Oak Springs, Illinois =

- Former settlement
- Location within Illinois
- Coordinates: 39°53′00″N 90°49′02″W
- Country: United States
- State: Illinois
- County: Brown
- Elevation: 682 ft (208 m)
- GNIS feature ID: 2040043

White Oak Springs is a former settlement in Buckhorn Township, Brown County, Illinois, United States. White Oak Springs was northeast of Benville and north-northwest of Morrelville.
