= Versailles (disambiguation) =

Versailles refers to the Palace of Versailles, a royal château in Versailles in the Île-de-France region of France.

Versailles, Versaille, Versalles, or Versalle may also refer to:

== Places ==
=== France ===
- Versailles, Yvelines, a town and a suburb of Paris, France; which contains the palace
- Arrondissement of Versailles, which contains the town
  - Versailles Chantiers station, a train station there, on the intercity line to Normandy and Brittany, amongst others
  - Versailles Cathedral, a Roman Catholic church located in Versailles, France
  - Versailles Château Rive Gauche station, a train station there, on RER line C
  - University of Versailles – Saint-Quentin-en-Yvelines, a French university there

=== United States ===
- Versailles, a village in Sprague, Connecticut
- Versailles (house), an unfinished mansion located in Windermere, Florida
- Versailles, Illinois, a village in Brown County
  - Versailles Township, Brown County, Illinois, which contains the village
- Versailles, Indiana
  - Versailles State Park near Versailles, Indiana
- Versailles, Kentucky
- Versailles, Louisiana
- Versailles, Missouri
- Versailles, New York
- Versailles, Ohio
  - Versailles High School, a school in Versailles, Ohio
- Versailles, Pennsylvania
- Versailles, Tennessee
- Versailles (Burgess, Virginia)
- North Versailles Township, Pennsylvania
- South Versailles Township, Pennsylvania

=== Other places ===
- Versalles, Buenos Aires, Argentina
- Versalles, Valle del Cauca, Colombia
- Versailles Lake, one of a maze of lakes in northwestern Saskatchewan, Canada

=== Cities nicknamed "Versailles" ===
- Białystok, Poland, Versailles of Podlachia
- Village de L'Est or Eastern New Orleans, New Orleans, Louisiana, a neighborhood known locally as "Versailles"

== Arts, entertainment, and media ==
=== Music ===
- Versailles (musician), American singer-songwriter
- Versailles (band), a Japanese metal band
  - Versailles (album), the self-titled fourth, and final, studio album by Versailles band
- "Versailles", a song by Billy Woods from Aethiopes (2022)
- "Versailles", a song by Swedish band Sabaton from The War to End All Wars (2022)
- "Versailles", a song by Carly Rae Jepsen from Day and Night (2026)

=== Other arts, entertainment, and media ===
- Versailles (film), a French film in the 2008 Cannes Film Festival
- Versailles (TV series), a 2015 Franco-Canadian historical television series
- Versailles 1685, a video game
- Versailles (play), a 2014 play by the Welsh playwright Peter Gill

== Businesses & Institutions ==
- FC Versailles 78, a French semi-professional association football club
- Place Versailles, a super regional mall in Montreal, Quebec, Canada
- Versailles Group plc, a London-based mezzanine finance institution that went bankrupt amidst a fraud scandal
- Versailles (restaurant), a restaurant in Little Havana, Miami, Florida
- Versailles (restaurant chain), a chain of restaurants from Los Angeles

== Automobiles ==
- Ford Versailles (France), an automobile produced in France between 1954 and 1957
- Ford Versailles, an automobile produced in Brazil between 1992 and 1996
- Lincoln Versailles, American luxury automobile produced 1977–1980

== Other uses ==
- Treaty of Versailles, the treaty between the Allied Powers and Germany that ended World War I.
- Versailles wedding hall disaster (Hebrew: אסון אולמי ורסאי), a 2001 building collapse that killed 23 in Talpiot, Jerusalem

== See also ==
- Ghosts of Versailles
- Treaty of Versailles (disambiguation)
- Versailles Township (disambiguation)
