= Versailles Township =

Versailles Township may refer to the following places in the United States:

- Versailles Township, Allegheny County, Pennsylvania and its subsequent daughter entities (Versailles Twp. ceased to exist in 1869):
  - North Versailles Township, Pennsylvania formed in 1869.
  - South Versailles Township, Pennsylvania formed in 1869 and its daughter entities:
    - The second Versailles Township formed in 1875; incorporated as the borough of White Oak, Pennsylvania in 1948.
      - Versailles, Pennsylvania formed in 1894.
- Versailles Township, Brown County, Illinois

== See also ==
- Versailles (disambiguation)
