= Roger Harrington =

Roger Harrington may refer to:

- Roger F. Harrington (born 1925), American electrical engineer and professor
- Roger Lee Harrington (1967–1995), American airport shuttle driver murdered by Mark Winger
- Roger Harrington, principal of Midtown High School (Marvel Comics)
