= Lee Township, Brown County, Illinois =

Lee Township
- Township
- Location in Brown County

- Brown County's location in Illinois
- Coordinates: 39°58′30″N 90°51′01″W
- Country: United States
- State: Illinois
- County: Brown
- Established: November 8, 1853

Area
  - Total: 37.67 sq mi (97.6 km^{2})
  - Land: 37.63 sq mi (97.5 km^{2})
  - Water: 0.04 sq mi (0.10 km^{2}) 0.11%
- Elevation: 728 ft (222 m)

Population (2020)
  - Total: 246
  - Density: 6.54/sq mi (2.52/km^{2})
- Time zone: UTC-6 (CST)
  - Summer (DST): UTC-5 (CDT)
- ZIP codes: 62353, 62375
- FIPS code: 17-009-42561

Lee Township is one of nine townships in Brown County, Illinois, USA. As of the 2020 census, its population was 246 and it contained 130 housing units.

== Geography ==
According to the 2010 census, the township has a total area of 37.67 square miles (97.6 km^{2}), of which 37.63 square miles (97.5 km^{2}) (or 99.89%) is land and 0.04 square miles (0.10 km^{2}) (or 0.11%) is water.

=== Cities ===
- Mound Station

=== Unincorporated towns ===
- Buckhorn
- Fargo
- Timewell

=== Cemeteries ===
The township contains these seven cemeteries: Ausmus, Buckhorn, Cleaves, Fargo, Howe, Lee and Orton.

=== Major highways ===
- US Route 24

=== Airports and landing strips ===
- Brown County Flyers Association Airport
- Mayfield Landing Strip
- Jennings Landing Strip

== Demographics ==
As of the 2020 census there were 246 people, 198 households, and 119 families residing in the township. The population density was 6.53 inhabitants per square mile (2.52/km^{2}). There were 130 housing units at an average density of 3.45 per square mile (1.33/km^{2}). The racial makeup of the township was 94.31% White, 0.00% African American, 0.00% Native American, 0.41% Asian, 0.00% Pacific Islander, 0.00% from other races, and 5.28% from two or more races. Hispanic or Latino of any race were 0.81% of the population.

There were 198 households, out of which 8.60% had children under the age of 18 living with them, 56.06% were married couples living together, 1.01% had a female householder with no spouse present, and 39.90% were non-families. 39.40% of all households were made up of individuals, and 2.50% had someone living alone who was 65 years of age or older. The average household size was 1.76 and the average family size was 2.22.

The township's age distribution consisted of 16.6% under the age of 18, 8.3% from 18 to 24, 20% from 25 to 44, 20.9% from 45 to 64, and 34.1% who were 65 years of age or older. The median age was 53.1 years. For every 100 females, there were 122.3 males. For every 100 females age 18 and over, there were 142.5 males.

The median income for a household in the township was $64,643, and the median income for a family was $77,298. Males had a median income of $36,947 versus $55,388 for females. The per capita income for the township was $36,264. About 5.0% of families and 4.3% of the population were below the poverty line, including 15.5% of those under age 18 and none of those age 65 or over.

Historical population
Census	Pop.	Note	%±
2010	326		—
2020	246		−24.5%
U.S. Decennial Census

== School districts ==
- Brown County Community Unit School District 1

== Political districts ==
- Illinois' 18th congressional district
- State House District 93
- State Senate District 47
