= Brown County Courthouse =

Brown County Courthouse may refer to:

- Brown County Courthouse Historic District, Nashville, Indiana
- Brown County Courthouse (Illinois), Mount Sterling, Illinois
- Brown County Courthouse (Kansas), Hiawatha, Kansas
- Brown County Courthouse (Minnesota), New Ulm, Minnesota
- Brown County Courthouse (Ohio), Georgetown, Ohio
- Brown County Courthouse (South Dakota), Aberdeen, South Dakota
- Brown County Courthouse (Texas), Brownwood, Texas
- Brown County Courthouse (Wisconsin), Green Bay, Wisconsin
