= White Oak Springs =

White Oak Springs may refer to:

- White Oak Springs, Illinois
- White Oak Springs, West Virginia
- White Oak Springs, Wisconsin
