= Brown County Courthouse (Illinois) =

Local government building in the United States

- U.S. Historic district – Contributing property
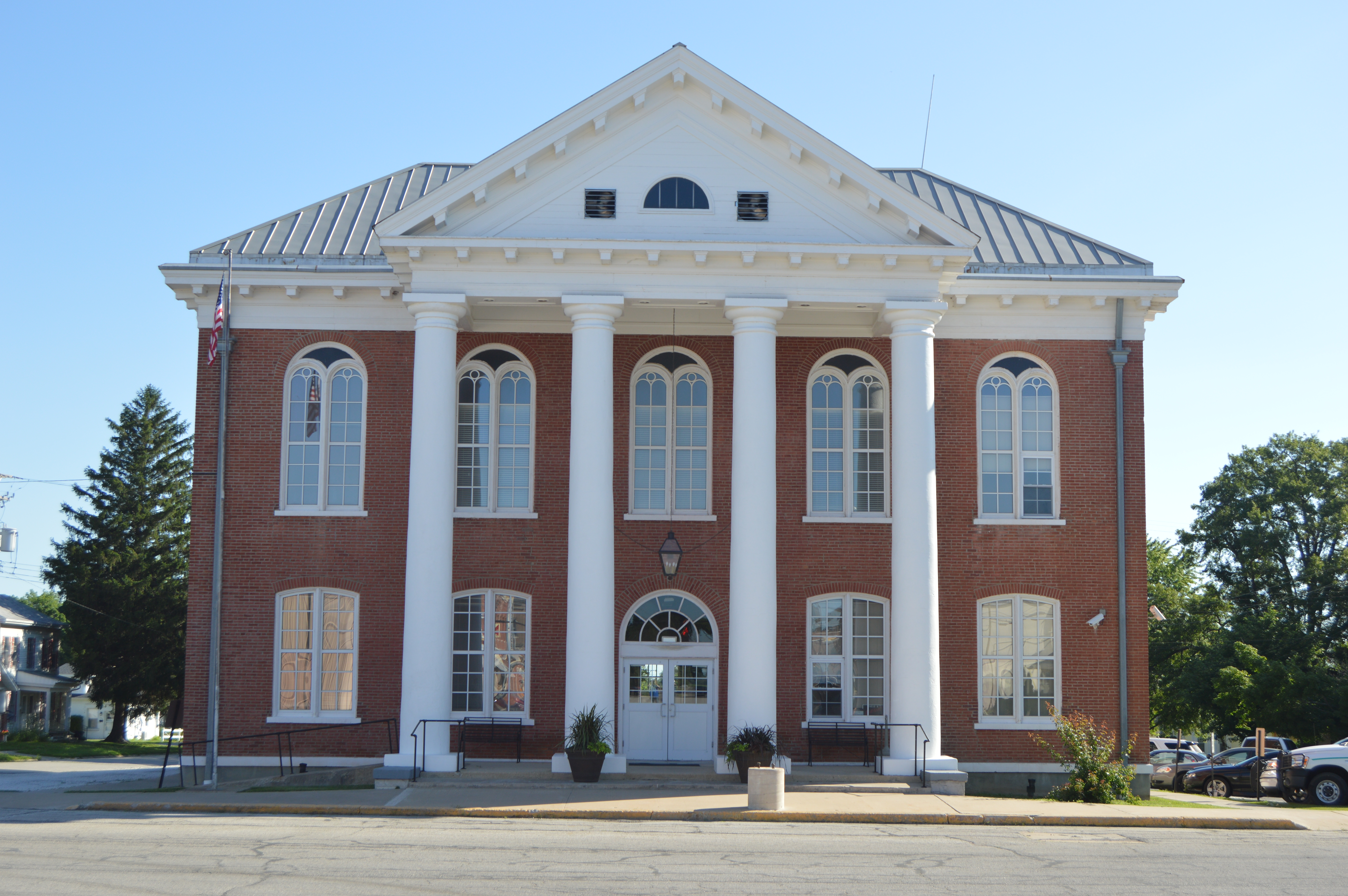
- Front of the courthouse

- Location within Illinois Location within the United States
- Interactive map showing the location of Brown County Courthouse
- Location: Bounded by North Street, East Court Street, Washington Street, and West Court Street, Mount Sterling, Illinois
- Coordinates: 39°59′12″N 90°45′51″W
- Built: 1868
- Architectural style: Neoclassical, Italianate
- Part of: Mount Sterling Commercial Historic District (ID87000724)
- Added to NRHP: May 8, 1987

The Brown County Courthouse is a government building in Mount Sterling, the county seat of Brown County, Illinois, United States. Completed in 1868 and rebuilt around 1940, it is the second courthouse in the county's history.

== County seat ==
Schuyler County was formed out of pieces of Pike and Fulton counties in 1825, but the new county was large enough that inhabitants of the southern part of the county found it inconvenient to reach the county seat of Rushville. Northern residents suggested moving the seat to Ripley, near the center of the county, but southerners petitioned for a separate county in 1838, and the General Assembly granted their request in early 1839 and named it for war hero Jacob Brown. The law designated Mount Sterling as the temporary county seat until a permanent seat should be chosen. Because that town's residents pledged more than $5,000 to construct public buildings (at a time when a county official might be paid $3 for a day's work), and because the town was conveniently located, Brown County officials chose Mount Sterling as the new seat.

== Previous courthouses ==
The seat's location now settled, bids for the construction of a courthouse were opened in September 1839. Designed by a Mr. Howland and built by contractor George Tebo, the courthouse was a two-story square brick building measuring 45 feet (14 m) on each side. A courtroom and related spaces occupied the second floor, while county offices were located on the first floor. Indecision by the county government delayed the start of construction until the second half of 1841, while delays by Tebo caused construction to continue far into 1843. Despite taking more than two years to finish his work, Tebo was unable to erect a structure capable of long endurance: significant repairs were needed in 1859, and in 1864 a county-appointed committee determined that the building was so dangerous that even drastic steps—destroying and rebuilding one whole side of the building and parts of two others, building a new foundation, and replacing the roof—were unlikely to render it safe for occupancy.

== Current courthouse ==
Nearly two years passed before any define steps were taken toward the erection of a new building. Preparations for choosing a design, renting rooms for temporary use, and selling the old courthouse were undertaken in 1866, and the new courthouse was first occupied in January 1868. The resulting building was a two-story gable-roofed structure with a pedimented central portico, five openings on each floor of the facade (a door and four large windows on the first floor, and five pairs of narrow arch windows on the second), and a tall cupola at the center of the roof. It lasted in this form until 1939, when fire largely destroyed the building, but instead of giving up on the remains and constructing a new courthouse, the county government chose to undertake a three-year rebuilding process. The body of the building is largely the same as before, but officials chose not to rebuild the cupola, and the courthouse was given a hip roof. In the post-fire courthouse, as in the short-lived first courthouse, county offices occupy the first floor and court facilities the second. The general plan resembles the letter "H" except for the portico with its fire-surviving Doric columns. Its overall appearance mixes elements of the Neoclassical and Italianate architectural styles.

== Historic site ==
The rebuilt 1868 courthouse has continued in use into the 21st century, and it remains a prominent building in the community. It lies at the end of the downtown area, separating commercial areas from residential neighborhoods. For these reasons, it lies at the northern end of the Mount Sterling Commercial Historic District, a historic district that was listed on the National Register of Historic Places in 1987.
