= Jaques, Illinois =

- Unincorporated community
- Location within Illinois Location within the United States
- Coordinates: 39°53′02″N 90°44′35″W
- Country: United States
- State: Illinois
- County: Brown
- Township: Elkhorn
- Elevation: 512 ft (156 m)
- Time zone: UTC-6 (Central (CST))
  - Summer (DST): UTC-5 (CDT)
- Area code: 217
- GNIS feature ID: 422845

Jaques (/ˈdʒeɪkwɪʃ/), formerly Jaques Mill or Rochester, is a former unincorporated town in Brown County, Illinois, United States. It was 7 miles (11 km) south of Mount Sterling and is near Illinois Route 107.

Located at the former site of a water-powered gristmill on McKee Creek, the community took its name from Hiram Jaques, who participated in building the mill in 1837. He initially worked at the mill as an employee of the owner, but in 1846 bought the mill and adjoining farm. At its peak the community had several homes, two stores, a furniture factory, a blacksmith shop, and a post office. By 1882, however, most of these businesses had disappeared.
