= Kingston, Adams County, Illinois =

Kingston, Illinois
- Census-designated place
- Location within Illinois Location within the United States
- Coordinates: 39°49′10″N 91°01′37″W
- Country: United States
- State: Illinois
- County: Adams
- Townships: Beverly and Richfield

Area
  - Total: 0.21 sq mi (0.55 km^{2})
  - Land: 0.21 sq mi (0.55 km^{2})
  - Water: 0 sq mi (0.00 km^{2})
- Elevation: 801 ft (244 m)

Population (2020)
  - Total: 20
  - Density: 94.0/sq mi (36.28/km^{2})
- Time zone: UTC-6 (Central (CST))
  - Summer (DST): UTC-5 (CDT)
- ZIP code: 62347 (Liberty)
- Area code: 217
- FIPS code: 17-40052
- GNIS feature ID: 2804086

Kingston is an unincorporated community and census-designated place in Beverly and Richfield Townships, Adams County, Illinois, United States. Kingston is located along Illinois Route 104 southeast of Liberty.

== History ==
A post office called Kingston was established in 1836. The community has the name of James King, a first settler.

== Geography ==
According to the 2021 census gazetteer files, Kingston has a total area of 0.21 square miles (0.54 km^{2}), all land.

== Demographics ==
Historical population
Census	Pop.	Note	%±
2020	20		—
U.S. Decennial Census

Kingston first appeared as a census designated place in the 2020 U.S. census.

As of the 2020 census there were 20 people, 42 households, and 33 families residing in the CDP. The population density was 93.90 inhabitants per square mile (36.25/km^{2}). There were 9 housing units at an average density of 42.25 per square mile (16.31/km^{2}). The racial makeup of the CDP was 95.00% White and 5.00% from two or more races.

== Education ==
It is in the Liberty Community Unit School District 2. The district's comprehensive high school is Liberty High School.
