= Liberty Township, Illinois =

Liberty Township may refer to one of the following places in the State of Illinois:

- Liberty Township, Adams County, Illinois
- Liberty Township, Effingham County, Illinois

See also

- Libertyville Township, Lake County, Illinois
- Liberty Township (disambiguation)
