= McKee Township, Illinois =

Township in Illinois, US

McKee Township
- Township
- Location in Adams County

- Adams County's location in Illinois
- Coordinates: 39°53′00″N 91°00′01″W
- Country: United States
- State: Illinois
- County: Adams

Area
  - Total: 36.11 sq mi (93.5 km^{2})
  - Land: 35.86 sq mi (92.9 km^{2})
  - Water: 0.24 sq mi (0.62 km^{2}) 0.66%
- Elevation: 610 ft (186 m)

Population (2020)
  - Total: 192
  - Density: 5.35/sq mi (2.07/km^{2})
- Time zone: UTC-6 (CST)
  - Summer (DST): UTC-5 (CDT)
- ZIP codes: 62320, 62324, 62347
- FIPS code: 17-001-45746

McKee Township is one of twenty-two townships in Adams County, Illinois, United States. As of the 2020 census, its population was 192 and it contained 100 housing units.

== Geography ==
According to the 2010 census, the township has a total area of 36.11 square miles (93.5 km^{2}), of which 35.86 square miles (92.9 km^{2}) (or 99.31%) is land and 0.24 square miles (0.62 km^{2}) (or 0.66%) is water.

=== Unincorporated towns ===
- Spring Valley

=== Cemeteries ===
The township contains twelve cemeteries: Burden, Durbin, Fairview, Goertz, Grady, Harwood, Lierly, Padgett, Perrigo, Spring Valley, Stevens and Whiaker.

=== Lakes ===
- Crabapple Lake

=== Landmarks ===
- Siloam Springs State Park

== Demographics ==
As of the 2020 census there were 192 people, 62 households, and 62 families residing in the township. The population density was 5.34 inhabitants per square mile (2.06/km^{2}). There were 100 housing units at an average density of 2.78 units per square mile (1.07 units/km^{2}). The racial makeup of the township was 95.83% White, 1.56% African American, 1.04% Native American, 0.00% Asian, 0.00% Pacific Islander, 0.00% from other races, and 1.56% from two or more races. Hispanic or Latino of any race were 5.73% of the population.

There were 62 households, out of which 6.50% had children under the age of 18 living with them, 100.00% were married couples living together, none had a female householder with no spouse present, and none were non-families. No households were made up of individuals. The average household size was 2.11 and the average family size was 2.11.

The township's age distribution consisted of 12.2% under the age of 18, 0.0% from 18 to 24, 0% from 25 to 44, 3.1% from 45 to 64, and 84.7% who were 65 years of age or older. The median age was 74.5 years. For every 100 females, there were 129.8 males. For every 100 females age 18 and over, there were 121.2 males.

The median income for a household in the township was $120,885, and the median income for a family was $120,885. The per capita income for the township was $50,072. None of the population was below the poverty line.

Historical population
Census	Pop.	Note	%±
2010	171		—
2020	192		12.3%
U.S. Decennial Census

== School districts ==
- Central Community Unit School District 3
- Liberty Community Unit School District 2

== Political districts ==
- Illinois' 18th congressional district
- State House District 93
- State Senate District 47
