= Beverly, Illinois =

- Census-designated place
- Location within Illinois Location within the United States
- Coordinates: 39°47′39″N 90°59′45″W
- Country: United States
- State: Illinois
- County: Adams
- Township: Beverly
- Founded: 1836
- Named for: Beverly, Massachusetts

Area
  - Total: 1.37 sq mi (3.56 km^{2})
  - Land: 1.37 sq mi (3.56 km^{2})
  - Water: 0 sq mi (0.00 km^{2})
- Elevation: 820 ft (250 m)

Population (2020)
  - Total: 72
  - Density: 52.3/sq mi (20.21/km^{2})
- Time zone: UTC-6 (Central (CST))
  - Summer (DST): UTC-5 (CDT)
- ZIP code: 62347 (Liberty)
- Area code: 217
- FIPS code: 17-05729
- GNIS feature ID: 2804081

Beverly is an unincorporated community and census-designated place in Beverly Township, Adams County, Illinois, United States. Beverly is about 26 miles (42 km) southeast of Quincy in the southeast corner of Adams County. As of the 2020 census, Beverly had a population of 72.

The village was founded in 1836 by a pioneer group. The village is named after the town of Beverly, Massachusetts. A post office called Beverly was established in 1837, and remained in operation until 1955.

== Geography ==
According to the 2021 census gazetteer files, Beverly has a total area of 1.38 square miles (3.57 km^{2}), all land.

== Demographics ==
Historical population
| Census | Pop. | Note | %± |
|---|---|---|---|
| 2020 | 72 | | — |
U.S. Decennial Census

Beverly first appeared as a census designated place in the 2020 U.S. census.

As of the 2020 census there were 72 people, 48 households, and 48 families residing in the CDP. The population density was 52.33 inhabitants per square mile (20.20/km^{2}). There were 34 housing units at an average density of 24.71 per square mile (9.54/km^{2}). The racial makeup of the CDP was 100.00% White. Hispanic or Latino of any race were 2.78% of the population.

== Education ==
It is in the Liberty Community Unit School District 2. The district's comprehensive high school is Liberty High School.
