= Ripley Township, Brown County, Illinois =

Ripley Township
- Township
- Location in Brown County

- Brown County's location in Illinois
- Coordinates: 40°01′34″N 90°39′32″W
- Country: United States
- State: Illinois
- County: Brown
- Established: November 8, 1853

Area
  - Total: 6.04 sq mi (15.6 km^{2})
  - Land: 6.04 sq mi (15.6 km^{2})
  - Water: 0 sq mi (0 km^{2}) 0%
- Elevation: 581 ft (177 m)

Population (2020)
  - Total: 70
  - Density: 12/sq mi (4.5/km^{2})
- Time zone: UTC-6 (CST)
  - Summer (DST): UTC-5 (CDT)
- ZIP code: 62353
- FIPS code: 17-009-64187

Ripley Township is one of nine townships in Brown County, Illinois, USA. As of the 2020 census, its population was 70 and it contained 44 housing units.

== Geography ==
According to the 2010 census, the township has a total area of 6.04 square miles (15.6 km^{2}), all land.

=== Cities ===
- Ripley (vast majority)

=== Cemeteries ===
The township contains Ripley Township Cemetery.

=== Major highways ===
- US Route 24

== Demographics ==
As of the 2020 census there were 70 people, 27 households, and 17 families residing in the township. The population density was 11.59 inhabitants per square mile (4.47/km^{2}). There were 44 housing units at an average density of 7.29 per square mile (2.81/km^{2}). The racial makeup of the township was 95.71% White, 0.00% African American, 0.00% Native American, 0.00% Asian, 0.00% Pacific Islander, 0.00% from other races, and 4.29% from two or more races. Hispanic or Latino of any race were 2.86% of the population.

There were 27 households, out of which 14.80% had children under the age of 18 living with them, 55.56% were married couples living together, 7.41% had a female householder with no spouse present, and 37.04% were non-families. 37.00% of all households were made up of individuals, and 29.60% had someone living alone who was 65 years of age or older. The average household size was 1.78 and the average family size was 2.24.

The township's age distribution consisted of 12.5% under the age of 18, none from 18 to 24, 14.6% from 25 to 44, 27.1% from 45 to 64, and 45.8% who were 65 years of age or older. The median age was 64.3 years. For every 100 females, there were 100.0 males. For every 100 females age 18 and over, there were 110.0 males.

The median income for a household in the township was $26,250. Males had a median income of $38,750 versus $30,625 for females. The per capita income for the township was $18,996. About 11.8% of families and 12.5% of the population were below the poverty line, including 33.3% of those under age 18 and 9.1% of those age 65 or over.

Historical population
Census	Pop.	Note	%±
2010	102		—
2020	70		−31.4%
U.S. Decennial Census

== School districts ==
- Brown County Community Unit School District 1

== Political districts ==
- Illinois' 18th congressional district
- State House District 93
- State Senate District 47
