= Missouri Township =

Missouri Township may refer to:

- Missouri Township, Nevada County, Arkansas, in Nevada County, Arkansas
- Missouri Township, Pike County, Arkansas, in Pike County, Arkansas
- Missouri Township, Brown County, Illinois
- Missouri Township, Boone County, Missouri
- Missouri Township, Burleigh County, North Dakota, in Burleigh County, North Dakota

== See also ==
- List of townships in Missouri
