= Damon, Illinois =

- Unincorporated community
- Location within Illinois Location within the United States
- Coordinates: 40°04′59″N 90°49′48″W
- Country: United States
- State: Illinois
- County: Brown
- Elevation: 686 ft (209 m)
- Time zone: UTC-6 (Central (CST))
  - Summer (DST): UTC-5 (CDT)
- Area code: 217
- GNIS feature ID: 422603

Damon is an unincorporated community in Brown County, Illinois, United States. Damon is northwest of Mount Sterling and northeast of Mound Station.

== History ==
A post office was established in 1894, and remained in operation until 1907. The origin of the name Damon is obscure.
