= Hersman =

Hersman is a surname. Notable people with the surname include:

- Deborah Hersman, chair of the U.S. National Transportation Safety Board
- Erik Hersman, technologist, blogger and commentator
- Hugh S. Hersman (1872–1954), American politician
- Martin Hersman (born 1974), Dutch skater

== See also ==
- Hersman, Illinois, unincorporated community in Brown County, Illinois, United States
- 31203 Hersman, main-belt asteroid
