= Beverly Township, Illinois =

Township in Illinois, US

Beverly Township
- Township
- Location in Adams County

- Adams County's location in Illinois
- Coordinates: 39°48′35″N 90°58′37″W
- Country: United States
- State: Illinois
- County: Adams
- Established: November 6, 1849

Area
  - Total: 36.67 sq mi (95.0 km^{2})
  - Land: 36.61 sq mi (94.8 km^{2})
  - Water: 0.05 sq mi (0.13 km^{2}) 0.14%
- Elevation: 794 ft (242 m)

Population (2020)
  - Total: 354
  - Density: 9.67/sq mi (3.73/km^{2})
- Time zone: UTC-6 (CST)
  - Summer (DST): UTC-5 (CDT)
- ZIP codes: 62312, 62314, 62347
- FIPS code: 17-001-05742

Beverly Township is one of twenty-two townships in Adams County, Illinois, USA. As of the 2020 census, its population was 354 and it contained 162 housing units.

== Geography ==
According to the 2010 census, the township has a total area of 36.67 square miles (95.0 km^{2}), of which 36.61 square miles (94.8 km^{2}) (or 99.84%) is land and 0.05 square miles (0.13 km^{2}) (or 0.14%) is water.

=== Unincorporated towns ===
- Beverly
- Chestline
- Kingston

(This list is based on USGS data and may include former settlements.)

=== Cemeteries ===
The township contains seven cemeteries: Allen Family, Old Beverly, Kingston, Mayfield Family, Mixer Family, Mound Prairie and Rubart.

=== Major highways ===
- Illinois State Route 104

== Demographics ==
As of the 2020 census there were 354 people, 112 households, and 94 families residing in the township. The population density was 9.64 inhabitants per square mile (3.72/km^{2}). There were 162 housing units at an average density of 4.41 units per square mile (1.70 units/km^{2}). The racial makeup of the township was 96.33% White, 0.56% African American, 0.28% Native American, 0.00% Asian, 0.00% Pacific Islander, 0.56% from other races, and 2.26% from two or more races. Hispanic or Latino of any race were 1.41% of the population.

There were 112 households, out of which 41.10% had children under the age of 18 living with them, 83.93% were married couples living together, 0.00% had a female householder with no spouse present, and 16.07% were non-families. 16.10% of all households were made up of individuals, and 8.00% had someone living alone who was 65 years of age or older. The average household size was 2.48 and the average family size was 2.77.

The township's age distribution consisted of 21.6% under the age of 18, none from 18 to 24, 37.4% from 25 to 44, 12.3% from 45 to 64, and 28.8% who were 65 years of age or older. The median age was 42.0 years. For every 100 females, there were 86.6 males. For every 100 females age 18 and over, there were 94.6 males.

The median income for a household in the township was $88,182, and the median income for a family was $100,208. Males had a median income of $48,958 versus $28,611 for females. The per capita income for the township was $29,845. About 24.5% of families and 24.8% of the population were below the poverty line, including 41.7% of those under age 18 and none of those age 65 or over.

Historical population
Census	Pop.	Note	%±
2016 (est.)	390
U.S. Decennial Census

== School districts ==
- Griggsville-Perry Community Unit School District 4
- Liberty Community Unit School District 2

== Political districts ==
- Illinois' 18th congressional district
- State House District 93
- State Senate District 47
