= Mount Sterling Commercial Historic District =

Historic district in Illinois, United States

- U.S. National Register of Historic Places
- U.S. Historic district
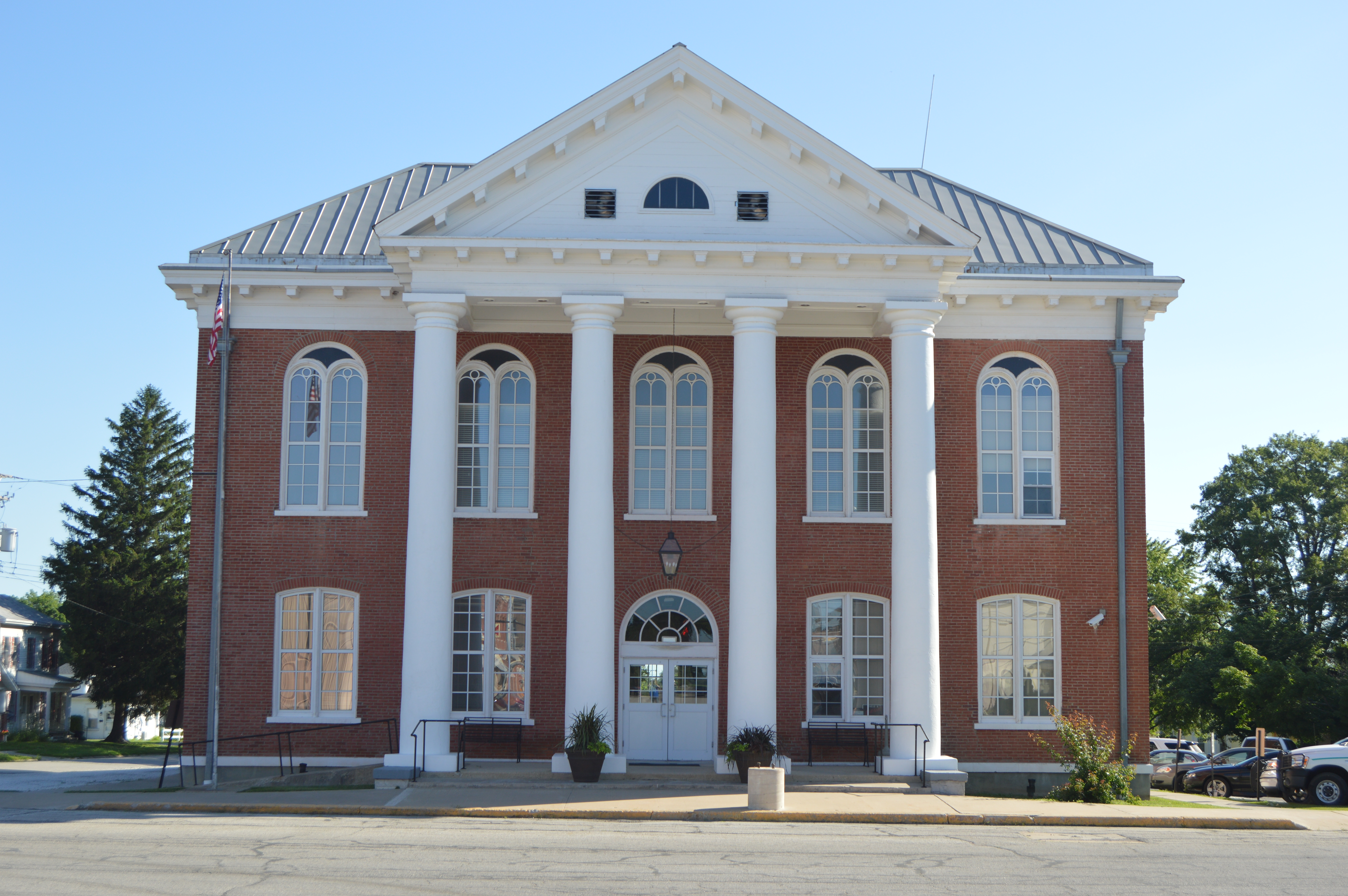
- Front of the courthouse

- Location within Illinois Location within the United States
- Interactive map showing the location of Mount Sterling Commercial Historical District
- Location: Roughly bounded by Brown Co. Courthouse, Alley E of Capitol, South St., and Alley W of Capitol, Mount Sterling, Illinois
- Coordinates: 39°59′11″N 90°45′52″W
- Area: 8 acres (3.2 ha)
- Architectural style: Classical Revival, Italianate Commercial
- NRHP reference No.: 87000724
- Added to NRHP: May 8, 1987

The Mount Sterling Commercial Historic District is a historic business district located in downtown Mount Sterling, Illinois. The district, located immediately south of the Brown County Courthouse, includes four entire city blocks and parts of four others; 38 buildings, of which 35 are contributing buildings, are in the district.

Nearly all of the buildings in the district are Italianate commercial buildings; the only exceptions are a Classical Revival bank building and the courthouse, which incorporates both Italianate and Classical Revival elements. Two government buildings are located in the district: the 1868 courthouse and the Mount Sterling public library, which is located in a former hardware store.

The district was added to the National Register of Historic Places on May 8, 1987.
