= John Bell Hatcher =

American paleontologist

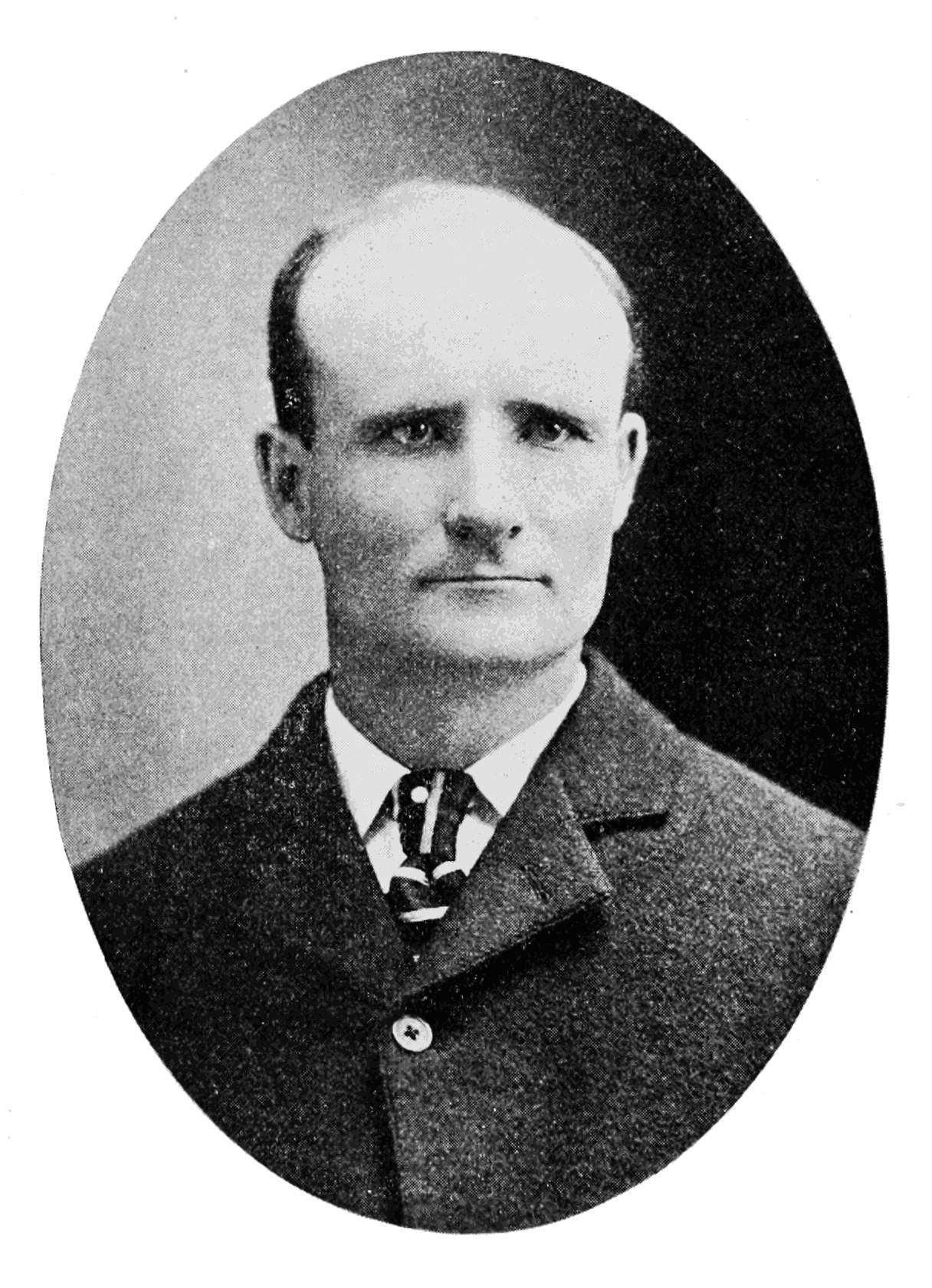
- Born: October 11, 1861; Cooperstown, Illinois, US
- Died: July 3, 1904 (aged 42); Pittsburgh, Pennsylvania, US
- Resting place: Homewood Cemetery (Pittsburgh, Pennsylvania)
- Education: Grinnell College; Yale University's Sheffield Scientific School
- Spouse: Anna Matilda Peterson
- Scientific career
- Fields: Paleontology, Botany
- Workplaces: United States Geological Survey; Peabody Museum of Natural History; Princeton University
- Thesis: On the Genus of Mosses termed Conomitrium (1884)

John Bell Hatcher (October 11, 1861 – July 3, 1904) was an American paleontologist and fossil hunter known as the "king of collectors" and best known for discovering Torosaurus and Triceratops, two genera of dinosaurs described by Othniel Charles Marsh. He was part of a new, professional middle class in American science, having financed his education with his labor while also being more educated than older fossil collectors. As such, he faced unique challenges throughout his long and productive career.

== Early life ==
Hatcher was born on October 11, 1861, in Cooperstown, Illinois, to John B. Hatcher (b. 1835) and Margaret Columbia O'Neal (b. 1842). When Hatcher was young, his father, who was both a farmer and a schoolteacher, moved the family to Cooper, Iowa. There he received his early education from his father and local schools. Hatcher attended the Guthrie County High School, in Panora, Iowa, and graduated in 1881.

=== Education ===
He first took an interest in paleontology and geology while working as a coal miner to save money for school and discovering fossils of ancient organisms. He matriculated at Grinnell College in 1880 or 1881, then transferred to Yale University's Sheffield Scientific School in 1882, in part because of the school's esteemed faculty which included James Dwight Dana, a well-renowned professor of geology. After receiving an education in geology, mineralogy, zoology, and botany, Hatcher graduated with a bachelor of philosophy degree from the "Sheff" in 1884 with the graduation thesis "On the Genus of Mosses termed Conomitrium." Before graduating, he showed his coal mines collection of Carboniferous fossils to George Jarvis Brush, professor of metallurgy and director of the Sheffield Scientific School, who then introduced him to the paleontologist Othniel C. Marsh.

== Career ==
=== Yale University & the United States Geological Survey ===
Embroiled with a passion for collecting fossils, Hatcher was hired by Marsh in 1884, for the initial sum of US$50 per month. His first assignment was to work under the supervision of Charles Hazelius Sternberg to collect materials from a site in Long Island, Kansas, dubbed the "Long Island Rhino Quarry" by biographer Lowell Dingus. Hatcher, with his formal education and training from Marsh, proved to be careful worker and was skilled in excavating fossils with less damage than other collectors inflicted. Based on his excavation methods at this site, Hatcher has been credited with being the first to develop a grid system of numbered squares over a dig site, using the grid map to record the exact locations from where specimens were excavated. This kind of map system is considered the basis of the discipline of Taphonomy. The Long Island Rhino Quarry yielded many specimens over various excavations, including fossils of the genus now known as Teleoceras.

Hatcher was in Marsh's employ until 1893, and he excelled in fossil fieldwork throughout the Western states. In 1889 near Lusk, Wyoming, Hatcher excavated the first fossil remains of Torosaurus. Hatcher was eventually unhappy at Yale, in part because of Marsh's policy of not allowing assistants to publish on their own. In Hatcher's correspondence to Marsh, he cited Marsh's failure to obtain for him a permanent position either with Yale University or the United States Geological Survey, as well as constant fieldwork with no breaks to work on his collections, as his reasons for seeking other employment.

In 1890, Hatcher asked William Berryman Scott of Princeton University for a position, but was not successful due to funding. He next negotiated with Henry Fairfield Osborn for a position at the American Museum of Natural History, but ultimately signed a contract with Marsh to work as an assistant in geology at the Peabody Museum of Natural History from 1891 to 1896; the contract also gave him the freedom to work with his collections when not in the field. However, in 1892, funding of the United States Geological Survey was dramatically cut by Congress, and Marsh could no longer pay Hatcher to collect for him in the West. After some negotiations, their contract ended early in 1893.

=== Princeton University ===
In 1893, with a letter of recommendation from Marsh, after fielding offers from Princeton University and the Philadelphia Academy of Sciences he began a seven-year employ at Princeton University under William Berryman Scott as curator of vertebrate paleontology in the Elizabeth Marsh Museum of Geology and Archaeology and assistant in geology, leading ongoing Princeton Scientific Expeditions during field season and instructing students in geology, paleontology, and field techniques. Although he had already authored two publications related to his collections while still at Yale, between 1893 and 1896 he authored eleven publications while at Princeton, fulfilling one of his long-held desires to work with his collections and write about his findings. He was elected to the American Philosophical Society in 1897.

In 1896, Hatcher conceived of, planned, and secured the greater part of the funding for three expeditions to Patagonia, as well as the idea of publishing the results of the expeditions with funding from J. Pierpont Morgan. In the 1896 expedition he was joined by his brother-in-law Olaf A. Peterson whom he hired away from the American Museum of Natural History to the dissatisfaction of Osborn. On the second expedition in 1897, taxidermist A. E. Coldburn accompanied Hatcher. For the third expedition, a young Barnum Brown of the American Museum of Natural History accompanied Hatcher, owing to Osborn's arrangement with Scott. The trips were chronicled in the Princeton University Expeditions to Patagonia, 1896-1899. Hatcher produced twelve publications between 1897 and 1903 related to these expeditions. Because of the similarity of the flora and fauna in Patagonia and Australia, he concluded that the two were once connected by land.

Hatcher resigned from Princeton in 1899, departing his position in 1900.

=== Carnegie Museum of Natural History ===
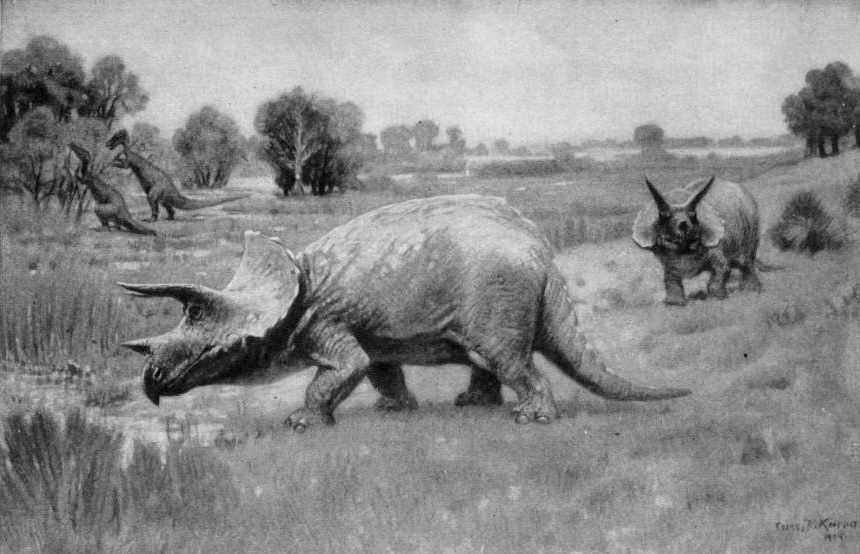
Triceratops painting Hatcher commissioned from Charles R. Knight, published in The Ceratopsia (1907)

Beginning in 1900, with recommendations from Dana, Marsh, Scott, and Yale President Timothy Dwight, Hatcher was hired by William Jacob Holland as curator of paleontology and osteology for the Carnegie Museum of Natural History, succeeding Jacob Lawson Wortman. Hatcher supervised William Harlow Reed and hired Charles Whitney Gilmore during his time at the Carnegie Museum. In addition to supervising field expeditions and excavations, he was responsible for the scientific investigation and display of Diplodocus carnegii, a species named by Hatcher for his patron Andrew Carnegie (1835–1919), the Scottish-American industrialist. Finished in 1907, casts of "Dippy" were sent to museums in the United Kingdom, Germany, France, Austria, Italy, Russia, Spain, Argentina, and Mexico. Hatcher's monograph on the find was published in 1901 as Diplodocus Marsh: Its Osteology, Taxonomy, and Probable Habits, with a Restoration of the Skeleton.

After succeeding Marsh as the paleontologist for the United States Geological Survey, Osborn asked Hatcher to complete a monograph on Ceratopsia begun by Marsh, who had died a few years earlier. Hatcher agreed but died before the publication was complete; the work was finally completed by Richard Swann Lull in 1907 and included an illustration by famed paleoartist Charles R. Knight.

== Personal life ==
Hatcher had six brothers and four sisters. Throughout his life, Hatcher suffered from health ailments. What was diagnosed as "rheumatism" during his lifetime is now thought by descendants to have been Type 1 osteogenesis imperfecta.

In 1887, Hatcher married Anna Matilda Peterson. They had seven children, three of whom did not reach adulthood.

Hatcher died in Pittsburgh, Pennsylvania, on July 3, 1904, of typhoid fever.

== Legacy ==
He is interred in Pittsburgh's Homewood Cemetery. For 91 years his grave went unmarked (his widow and children moved back to Iowa after his death). However, at the 1995 annual meeting in Pittsburgh of the Society of Vertebrate Paleontology, some members bought him a headstone engraved with his name and the name of his daughter, Ruth, and the sandblasted image of Torosaurus.

Hatcher is commemorated in the scientific name of a species of South American lizard, Liolaemus hatcheri, and the scientific name of a notoungulate, Johnbell hatcheri.
