= Elkhorn Township, Brown County, Illinois =

Elkhorn Township
- Township
- Location in Brown County

- Brown County's location in Illinois
- Coordinates: 39°52′58″N 90°43′52″W
- Country: United States
- State: Illinois
- County: Brown
- Established: November 8, 1853

Area
  - Total: 37.4 sq mi (97 km^{2})
  - Land: 37.4 sq mi (97 km^{2})
  - Water: 0 sq mi (0 km^{2}) 0%
- Elevation: 490 ft (150 m)

Population (2020)
  - Total: 290
  - Density: 7.8/sq mi (3.0/km^{2})
- Time zone: UTC-6 (CST)
  - Summer (DST): UTC-5 (CDT)
- ZIP codes: 62323, 62353, 62378
- FIPS code: 17-009-23308

Elkhorn Township is one of nine townships in Brown County, Illinois, USA. As of the 2020 census, its population was 290 and it contained 153 housing units.

== Geography ==
According to the 2010 census, the township has a total area of 37.4 square miles (97 km^{2}), all land.

=== Unincorporated towns ===
- Jaques

=== Cemeteries ===
The township contains these eleven cemeteries: Dearborn, Gilbirds, Hebron, Law, Marden, Newenham, Reeves, Rusk, Stoner, Tucker and Zion Lutheran.

=== Major highways ===
- Illinois Route 99
- Illinois Route 107

== Demographics ==
As of the 2020 census there were 290 people, 131 households, and 119 families residing in the township. The population density was 7.75 inhabitants per square mile (2.99/km^{2}). There were 153 housing units at an average density of 4.09 units per square mile (1.58 units/km^{2}). The racial makeup of the township was 94.83% White, 0.00% African American, 0.69% Native American, 0.69% Asian, 0.00% Pacific Islander, 0.00% from other races, and 3.79% from two or more races. Hispanic or Latino of any race were 0.34% of the population.

There were 131 households, out of which 61.80% had children under the age of 18 living with them, 90.84% were married couples living together, 0.00% had a female householder with no spouse present, and 9.16% were non-families. 9.20% of all households were made up of individuals, and 9.20% had someone living alone who was 65 years of age or older. The average household size was 3.08 and the average family size was 3.21.

The township's age distribution consisted of 37.9% under the age of 18, 2.5% from 18 to 24, 42.1% from 25 to 44, 7% from 45 to 64, and 10.6% who were 65 years of age or older. The median age was 32.2 years. For every 100 females, there were 71.2 males. For every 100 females age 18 and over, there were 109.2 males.

The median income for a household in the township was $112,656, and the median income for a family was $114,531. Males had a median income of $72,292 versus $40,625 for females. The per capita income for the township was $39,883. About 21.0% of families and 28.7% of the population were below the poverty line, including 41.2% of those under age 18 and none of those age 65 or over.

Historical population
Census	Pop.	Note	%±
2010	346		—
2020	290		−16.2%
U.S. Decennial Census

== School districts ==
- Brown County Community Unit School District 1

== Political districts ==
- Illinois' 18th congressional district
- State House District 93
- State Senate District 47
