= Fargo, Illinois =

- Unincorporated community
- Location within Illinois Location within the United States
- Coordinates: 39°58′25″N 90°51′17″W
- Country: United States
- State: Illinois
- County: Brown
- Elevation: 745 ft (227 m)
- Time zone: UTC-6 (Central (CST))
  - Summer (DST): UTC-5 (CDT)
- Area code: 217
- GNIS feature ID: 422690

Fargo is an unincorporated community in Brown County, Illinois, United States. Fargo is 3 miles (4.8 km) southeast of Mound Station.
