= Benville, Illinois =

- Unincorporated community
- Location within Illinois Location within the United States
- Coordinates: 39°51′51″N 90°51′53″W
- Country: United States
- State: Illinois
- County: Brown
- Township: Buckhorn
- Named after: Ben Akright
- Elevation: 732 ft (223 m)
- Time zone: UTC-6 (Central (CST))
  - Summer (DST): UTC-5 (CDT)
- ZIP code: 62353
- Area code: 217
- GNIS feature ID: 422459

Benville is an unincorporated community in Buckhorn Township, Brown County, Illinois, United States. Benville is southeast of Siloam Springs State Park.

The community is named after Ben Akright, who had a general store in the area in the 1850s.
