= Cooperstown, Illinois =

- Unincorporated community
- Location within Illinois Location within the United States
- Coordinates: 39°57′50″N 90°36′23″W
- Country: United States
- State: Illinois
- County: Brown
- Elevation: 633 ft (193 m)
- Time zone: UTC-6 (Central (CST))
  - Summer (DST): UTC-5 (CDT)
- Area code: 217
- GNIS feature ID: 406561

Cooperstown is an unincorporated community in Brown County, Illinois, United States. It is located east of Mount Sterling and southeast of Ripley.

William H. Dieterich, member of the Illinois House of Representatives, U.S. Representative from Illinois, and U.S. Senator from Illinois, was born near Cooperstown.
