= Liolaemus hatcheri =

Conservation status
- Least Concern (IUCN 3.1)

Scientific classification
- Kingdom: Animalia
- Phylum: Chordata
- Class: Reptilia
- Order: Squamata
- Suborder: Iguania
- Family: Liolaemidae
- Genus: Liolaemus
- Species: L. hatcheri

Binomial name
- Liolaemus hatcheri Stejneger, 1909

Synonyms
- Vilcunia periglacialis Cei & Scolaro, 1982

Species of lizard

Liolaemus hatcheri is a species of lizard in the family Liolaemidae. The species is endemic to Argentina.

== Etymology ==
The specific name, hatcheri, is in honor of American paleontologist John Bell Hatcher.

== Geographic range ==
L. hatcheri is found in Santa Cruz Province, Argentina.

== Habitat ==
The preferred natural habitats of L. hatcheri are grassland and shrubland, at altitude of 900–1,500 m (3,000–4,900 ft).

== Diet ==
L. hatcheri preys predominately upon insects.

== Reproduction ==
The mode of reproduction of L. hatcheri has been described as being viviparous and as being ovoviviparous.
