= Ghosts of Versailles =

Ghosts of Versailles may refer to

- The Ghosts of Versailles, a 1983 opera by John Corigliano and William M. Hoffman
- Moberly–Jourdain incident or Ghosts of Versailles, a 1901 claim of time travel and hauntings
  - Miss Morison's Ghosts, a 1981 British supernatural television drama based on the Moberly-Joudain incident

== See also ==
- Versailles (disambiguation)
