= Liberty High School (Illinois) =

Coordinates: 39°53′9.2″N 91°6′29.5″W

- 505 North Park Street; Liberty, IL 62347

Information
- Type: public high school
- School district: Liberty Community Unit School District 2
- Principal: Kimberly Harrison
- Grades: 7-12
- Enrollment: 267 (2023–2024)
- Color
- Athletics: Class 1A
- Athletics conference: Pike County
- Mascot: Eagle
- Information: (217) 645-5000
- Website: www.libertyschool.net/highschool

Liberty High School is a public high school in Liberty, Illinois. It is a part of the Liberty Community Unit School District 2. The district, of which this is the sole high school, includes the municipality of Liberty, the census-designated places of Beverly and Kingston, and a piece of the Adams CDP.

In 2005, Liberty High School had an average class size of 19 and a student:teacher ratio of 15.3.
