= Western Illinois Correctional Center =

Prison in Illinois, United States

Coordinates: 39°57′45″N 90°45′02″W

- Interactive map of Western Illinois Correctional Center
- Location: Mount Sterling, Brown County, Illinois
- Status: Operational
- Capacity: 2123
- Population: 1442 (30 June 2024)
- Opened: April 1989
- Managed by: Illinois Department of Corrections
- Warden: Brittany Greene
- Website: idoc.illinois.gov/facilities/correctionalfacilities/facility.western-illinois-correctional-center.html

The Western Illinois Correctional Center is a medium-security state prison for men located just south of Mount Sterling, Brown County, Illinois, owned and operated by the Illinois Department of Corrections.

The facility was first opened in 1989, and has a working capacity of 2173.

== Notable inmates ==
- Mark Winger, convicted murderer
