= Missouri Township, Brown County, Illinois =

Missouri Township
- Township
- Location in Brown County

- Brown County's location in Illinois
- Coordinates: 40°03′39″N 90°44′41″W
- Country: United States
- State: Illinois
- County: Brown
- Established: November 8, 1853

Area
  - Total: 35.44 sq mi (91.8 km^{2})
  - Land: 35.44 sq mi (91.8 km^{2})
  - Water: 0 sq mi (0 km^{2}) 0%
- Elevation: 669 ft (204 m)

Population (2020)
  - Total: 156
  - Density: 4.40/sq mi (1.70/km^{2})
- Time zone: UTC-6 (CST)
  - Summer (DST): UTC-5 (CDT)
- ZIP code: 62353
- FIPS code: 17-009-49685

Missouri Township is one of nine townships in Brown County, Illinois, USA. As of the 2020 census, its population was 156 and it contained 87 housing units.

== Geography ==
According to the 2010 census, the township has a total area of 35.44 square miles (91.8 km^{2}), all land.

=== Cemeteries ===
The township contains these eight cemeteries: Beans, Bell, Clark, Glasgow Farm, Kinman Burial Ground, Linn-Walker Graves, Miller Land and Rigg.

=== Major highways ===
- Illinois Route 99

== Demographics ==
As of the 2020 census there were 156 people, 86 households, and 28 families residing in the township. The population density was 4.41 inhabitants per square mile (1.70/km^{2}). There were 87 housing units at an average density of 2.46 per square mile (0.95/km^{2}). The racial makeup of the township was 98.72% White, 0.00% African American, 0.00% Native American, 0.00% Asian, 0.00% Pacific Islander, 0.64% from other races, and 0.64% from two or more races. None of the population was Hispanic or Latino of any race.

There were 86 households, out of which 2.30% had children under the age of 18 living with them, 32.56% were married couples living together, none had a female householder with no spouse present, and 67.44% were non-families. 57.00% of all households were made up of individuals, and 30.20% had someone living alone who was 65 years of age or older. The average household size was 1.38 and the average family size was 1.93.

The township's age distribution consisted of 2.5% under the age of 18, 19.3% from 18 to 24, 3.4% from 25 to 44, 53% from 45 to 64, and 21.8% who were 65 years of age or older. The median age was 56.5 years. For every 100 females, there were 142.9 males. For every 100 females age 18 and over, there were 136.7 males.

The median income for a household in the township was $65,882. The per capita income for the township was $53,952. None of the population was below the poverty line.

Historical population
Census	Pop.	Note	%±
2010	143		—
2020	156		9.1%
U.S. Decennial Census

== School districts ==
- Brown County Community Unit School District 1

== Political districts ==
- Illinois's 18th congressional district
- State House District 93
- State Senate District 47
