= Liberty Township, Adams County, Illinois =

Township in Illinois, US

Liberty Township
- Township
- Location in Adams County

- Adams County's location in Illinois
- Coordinates: 39°53′13″N 91°05′33″W
- Country: United States
- State: Illinois
- County: Adams
- Established: November 6, 1849

Area
  - Total: 36.91 sq mi (95.6 km^{2})
  - Land: 36.89 sq mi (95.5 km^{2})
  - Water: 0.02 sq mi (0.052 km^{2}) 0.05%
- Elevation: 719 ft (219 m)

Population (2020)
  - Total: 1,379
  - Density: 37.38/sq mi (14.43/km^{2})
- Time zone: UTC-6 (CST)
  - Summer (DST): UTC-5 (CDT)
- ZIP codes: 62320, 62324, 62347
- FIPS code: 17-001-43146

Liberty Township is one of twenty-two townships in Adams County, Illinois, United States. As of the 2010 census, its population was 1,379 and it contained 557 housing units.

== Geography ==
According to the 2010 census, the township has a total area of 36.91 square miles (95.6 km^{2}), of which 36.89 square miles (95.5 km^{2}) (or 99.95%) is land and 0.02 square miles (0.052 km^{2}) (or 0.05%) is water.

=== Cities ===
- Liberty

=== Cemeteries ===
The township contains sixteen cemeteries: Broady Family, Clark Family, Coats, Drescher Family, Elmwood Family, Grubb Family, Hughes Family, Liberty Old, Lierly, Nation, Pearce, Pleasant View, Saint Brigids, Walker, Williams Family and Xander.

=== Major highways ===
- Illinois State Route 104

== Demographics ==
As of the 2020 census there were 1,379 people, 447 households, and 366 families residing in the township. The population density was 37.36 inhabitants per square mile (14.42/km^{2}). There were 557 housing units at an average density of 15.09 per square mile (5.83/km^{2}). The racial makeup of the township was 95.65% White, 0.44% African American, 0.07% Native American, 0.07% Asian, 0.00% Pacific Islander, 0.44% from other races, and 3.34% from two or more races. Hispanic or Latino of any race were 1.09% of the population.

There were 447 households, out of which 41.60% had children under the age of 18 living with them, 67.79% were married couples living together, 14.09% had a female householder with no spouse present, and 18.12% were non-families. 18.10% of all households were made up of individuals, and 10.30% had someone living alone who was 65 years of age or older. The average household size was 2.56 and the average family size was 2.87.

The township's age distribution consisted of 29.6% under the age of 18, 1.9% from 18 to 24, 16.4% from 25 to 44, 40.3% from 45 to 64, and 11.7% who were 65 years of age or older. The median age was 45.5 years. For every 100 females, there were 97.8 males. For every 100 females age 18 and over, there were 85.5 males.

The median income for a household in the township was $76,042, and the median income for a family was $78,468. Males had a median income of $53,417 versus $39,258 for females. The per capita income for the township was $33,369. About 3.6% of families and 8.0% of the population were below the poverty line, including 16.9% of those under age 18 and 5.2% of those age 65 or over.

Historical population
Census	Pop.	Note	%±
2010	1,360		—
2020	1,379		1.4%

== School districts ==
- Liberty Community Unit School District 2

== Political districts ==
- Illinois' 18th congressional district
- State House District 93
- State Senate District 47
