= Buckhorn, Illinois =

- Unincorporated community
- Location within Illinois Location within the United States
- Coordinates: 39°56′12″N 90°50′09″W
- Country: United States
- State: Illinois
- County: Brown
- Elevation: 718 ft (219 m)
- Time zone: UTC-6 (Central (CST))
  - Summer (DST): UTC-5 (CDT)
- Area code: 217
- GNIS feature ID: 422510

Buckhorn is an unincorporated community in Brown County, Illinois, United States. Buckhorn is 7 miles (11 km) southwest of Mount Sterling.
