= Versailles Township, Brown County, Illinois =

Versailles Township
- Township
- Location in Brown County

- Brown County's location in Illinois
- Coordinates: 39°53′04″N 90°37′43″W
- Country: United States
- State: Illinois
- County: Brown
- Established: November 8, 1853

Area
  - Total: 36.7 sq mi (95 km^{2})
  - Land: 36.06 sq mi (93.4 km^{2})
  - Water: 0.64 sq mi (1.7 km^{2}) 1.74%
- Elevation: 574 ft (175 m)

Population (2020)
  - Total: 656
  - Density: 18.2/sq mi (7.02/km^{2})
- Time zone: UTC-6 (CST)
  - Summer (DST): UTC-5 (CDT)
- ZIP codes: 62353, 62378
- FIPS code: 17-009-77733

Versailles Township is one of nine townships in Brown County, Illinois, USA. As of the 2020 census, its population was 656 and it contained 363 housing units.

== Geography ==
According to the 2010 census, the township has a total area of 36.7 square miles (95 km^{2}), of which 36.06 square miles (93.4 km^{2}) (or 98.26%) is land and 0.64 square miles (1.7 km^{2}) (or 1.74%) is water.

=== Cities ===
- Versailles

=== Cemeteries ===
The township contains these fifteen cemeteries: Arnold, Casteen, Dawson, Hall, Hambaugh, Lavina Henry, Martin, Mount Zion, Robison, Root, South Side, Suratt Burial Ground, Vandeventer, West Side and Woods.

=== Major highways ===
- Illinois Route 99

=== Airports and landing strips ===
- Sneider Landing Strip

== Demographics ==
As of the 2020 census there were 656 people, 251 households, and 132 families residing in the township. The population density was 17.84 inhabitants per square mile (6.89/km^{2}). There were 363 housing units at an average density of 9.87 per square mile (3.81/km^{2}). The racial makeup of the township was 96.34% White, 0.46% African American, 0.46% Native American, 0.00% Asian, 0.00% Pacific Islander, 0.00% from other races, and 2.74% from two or more races. Hispanic or Latino of any race were 0.61% of the population.

There were 251 households, out of which 23.10% had children under the age of 18 living with them, 49.00% were married couples living together, 3.59% had a female householder with no spouse present, and 47.41% were non-families. 46.20% of all households were made up of individuals, and 33.50% had someone living alone who was 65 years of age or older. The average household size was 2.16 and the average family size was 3.11.

The township's age distribution consisted of 23.2% under the age of 18, 0.6% from 18 to 24, 26% from 25 to 44, 23.5% from 45 to 64, and 26.8% who were 65 years of age or older. The median age was 46.1 years. For every 100 females, there were 97.1 males. For every 100 females age 18 and over, there were 98.1 males.

The median income for a household in the township was $47,625, and the median income for a family was $67,273. Males had a median income of $36,429 versus $28,214 for females. The per capita income for the township was $25,537. About 7.6% of families and 11.6% of the population were below the poverty line, including 3.2% of those under age 18 and 24.8% of those age 65 or over.

Historical population
Census	Pop.	Note	%±
2010	750		—
2020	656		−12.5%
U.S. Decennial Census

== School districts ==
- Brown County Community Unit School District 1
- Meredosia-Chambersburg Community Unit School District 11

== Political districts ==
- Illinois's 18th congressional district
- State House District 93
- State Senate District 47
