= Morrelville, Illinois =

- Unincorporated community
- Location within Illinois Location within the United States
- Coordinates: 39°51′01″N 90°48′01″W
- Country: United States
- State: Illinois
- County: Brown
- Elevation: 686 ft (209 m)
- Time zone: UTC-6 (Central (CST))
  - Summer (DST): UTC-5 (CDT)
- Area code: 217
- GNIS feature ID: 423000

Morrelville is an unincorporated community in Brown County, Illinois, United States. Morrelville is 11 miles (18 km) south of Mount Sterling.
