= La Grange, Brown County, Illinois =

La Grange, Illinois
- Unincorporated community
- Location within Illinois Location within the United States
- Coordinates: 39°56′50″N 90°32′14″W
- Country: United States
- State: Illinois
- County: Brown
- Elevation: 466 ft (142 m)
- Time zone: UTC-6 (Central (CST))
  - Summer (DST): UTC-5 (CDT)
- Area code: 217
- GNIS feature ID: 411637

La Grange is an unincorporated community in Brown County, Illinois, United States. La Grange is located on the west bank of the Illinois River, southwest of Beardstown and north of Meredosia. It is the site of the La Grange Lock and Dam on the Illinois River.
