= Hersman, Illinois =

- Unincorporated community
- Location within Illinois Location within the United States
- Coordinates: 39°57′00″N 90°44′28″W
- Country: United States
- State: Illinois
- County: Brown
- Elevation: 699 ft (213 m)
- Time zone: UTC-6 (Central (CST))
  - Summer (DST): UTC-5 (CDT)
- Area code: 217
- GNIS feature ID: 410113

Hersman is an unincorporated community in Brown County, Illinois, United States. Hersman is located on Illinois Route 99, southeast of Mount Sterling.
