= Mark Winger =

American convicted murderer (born 1962)

- Born: Mark Alan Winger; November 26, 1962 (age 63); Elyria, Ohio, U.S.
- Other name: Hero Husband
- Education: Virginia Military Institute (BS)
- Occupation: Former Nuclear engineer
- Spouses: Donnah Brown (m. 1989; murdered 1995); Rebecca Simic (m. 1996, divorced)
- Convictions: First-degree murder of wife Donnah Winger and driver Roger Harrington (2002); solicitation of murder of ex-girlfriend and a family friend (2007)
- Criminal charge: Murder
- Penalty: Life imprisonment without the possibility of parole plus 35 years

Mark Alan Winger (born November 26, 1962) is a former nuclear engineer from Springfield, Illinois. He was convicted in 2002 of the 1995 murders of his wife, Donnah Winger (born 1963), and Roger Harrington (born 1967).

== Early life, education, and career ==
Winger was born on November 26, 1962, in Elyria, Ohio, a residential suburb of Cleveland, to Sallie (née Fishman) and Jerrold Winger. He was raised Jewish alongside an older brother and sister in Elyria and went on to attend Elyria High School, graduating in 1981. He enrolled in the Virginia Military Institute, receiving a bachelor's degree in physics in 1985, after which he was commissioned as a second lieutenant in the United States Army. Following two years of service, one overseas in South Korea and one back in the U.S. in Georgia, Winger was hired by a laboratory instrument manufacturing firm in Riviera Beach, Florida.

== Murder of Donnah Winger ==
=== Courtship and marriage ===
In late 1987 or early 1988, Winger was set up on a blind date with operating room technician Donnah Ellen Brown, a coworker of his brother. Winger proposed marriage after the two had dated for approximately six months, and Brown accepted. The couple were married on March 4, 1989, at Temple Solel in Hollywood, Florida, and, after a short time in Florida, they settled in Springfield, Illinois. Winger and his wife adopted a baby daughter on June 1, 1995.

=== Murder and trial ===
On August 23, 1995, Donnah Winger was driven from St. Louis International Airport to her home in Springfield by shuttle driver Roger Harrington. The Wingers later complained to Harrington's employer, saying that Harrington gave Donnah a "hard time" during the ride by talking about getting high and having orgies. Six days later, Mark Winger called 911, saying that he had shot Harrington to death after Harrington killed Donnah with a hammer in their home. The police initially believed that Harrington had broken into the Wingers' home and murdered Donnah in retaliation for their complaint to Harrington's employer. However, investigators later became suspicious of Winger because he continued to ask about the case even after it had been initially closed. "He kept coming in. I kept feeling like he was trying to find out if we were checking into anything," said a detective. Winger's remarriage to his young daughter's new nanny, Rebecca Simic, hired five months after Donnah died, increased suspicion. Winger eventually had three children with his new wife.

Four years after Donnah's death, her best friend, DeAnn Shultz, came forward and told police that she and Winger had been involved in an affair at the time of Donnah's death. Shultz felt jilted when Winger had ended the affair soon after Donnah's death and married the nanny instead of her; she struggled with depression after the events, and suspected that he had killed Donnah. On reexamination of the evidence, police concluded that the positions of Donnah's and Harrington's bodies were inconsistent with Winger's account of a struggle with Harrington. They also found evidence in Harrington's car that Mark Winger had invited Harrington to the Winger home. The new theory was that Donnah's upsetting ride with Harrington inspired Winger to plan to kill her with the hammer and then to shoot Harrington, using the fabricated story of an attack by Harrington as a cover. He was charged with murder in 2001.

Evidence introduced at trial included recorded conversations between Winger and Harrington arranging a meeting on the day of the murders. Testimony from paramedics that they found Donnah face down contradicted Winger's statement that he had held his wife before they arrived. Shultz also testified that Winger had tried to involve her in his plot and told her it would be better if Donnah died. In May 2002, a jury convicted Winger of the first-degree murders of Donnah and Harrington, and he was sentenced to life in prison without parole. Winger is currently incarcerated at Western Illinois Correctional Center.

== Solicitation of murder from prison ==
In 2006, Winger was indicted for asking a fellow prison inmate to arrange two murders. One of his intended murder victims was Donnah's best friend, DeAnn Schultz, with whom he had an affair for a month before the murders, who later testified against him during his trial. The second intended victim was Jeffrey Gelman, a childhood friend, whom Winger resented for refusing to post his $1 million bail. Winger initially wanted Gelman kidnapped for ransom and then wanted both Gelman and Schultz killed. In June 2007, Winger was convicted for solicitation of murder, and a 35-year sentence was added to his existing life-without-parole sentence. As of 2021, Winger's second wife never remarried and raised all of the Winger children on her own.

== Media ==
Winger's case has been featured on the following television programs:

- "A Welcome Intrusion", a 2004 episode of Forensic Files;
- Deadly Sins (Season 3, Episode 8: "Rotten to the Core");
- 20/20 (Season 43, Episode 22: "The Perfect Lie"); and
- 48 Hours ("Invitation to Murder").

== See also ==
- Uxoricide, the killing of one's own wife
