= Lee Township, Buena Vista County, Iowa =

Township in Iowa, US

Lee Township, Buena Vista County
- Township
- Coordinates: 42°51′30″N 095°04′57″W
- Country: United States
- State: Iowa
- County: Buena Vista

Area
  - Total: 35.68 sq mi (92.42 km^{2})
  - Land: 35.66 sq mi (92.37 km^{2})
  - Water: 0.019 sq mi (0.05 km^{2})
- Elevation: 1,329 ft (405 m)

Population (2000)
  - Total: 272
  - Density: 7.5/sq mi (2.9/km^{2})
- FIPS code: 19-92400
- GNIS feature ID: 0468198

Lee Township is one of eighteen townships in Buena Vista County, Iowa, United States. As of the 2000 census, its population was 272.

== Geography ==
Lee Township covers an area of 35.68 square miles (92.4 km^{2}) and contains no incorporated settlements. According to the USGS, it contains two cemeteries: Lone Tree and Saint Josephs.
