= Lee Township, Adair County, Iowa =

Township in Iowa, US

Lee Township, Adair County
- Township
- Coordinates: 41°17′07″N 094°24′26″W
- Country: United States
- State: Iowa
- County: Adair

Area
  - Total: 29.74 sq mi (77.02 km^{2})
  - Land: 29.70 sq mi (76.92 km^{2})
  - Water: 0.039 sq mi (0.1 km^{2})
- Elevation: 1,289 ft (393 m)

Population (2010)
  - Total: 214
  - Density: 7.3/sq mi (2.8/km^{2})
- Time zone: UTC-6 (CST)
  - Summer (DST): UTC-5 (CDT)
- FIPS code: 19-92397
- GNIS feature ID: 0468197

Lee Township is one of seventeen townships in Adair County, Iowa, USA. At the 2010 census, its population was 214.

== History ==
Lee Township was organized in 1880.

== Geography ==
Lee Township covers an area of 29.74 square miles (77.0 km^{2}) and contains no incorporated settlements.
