= Brown County, Illinois =

County in Illinois, United States

- County
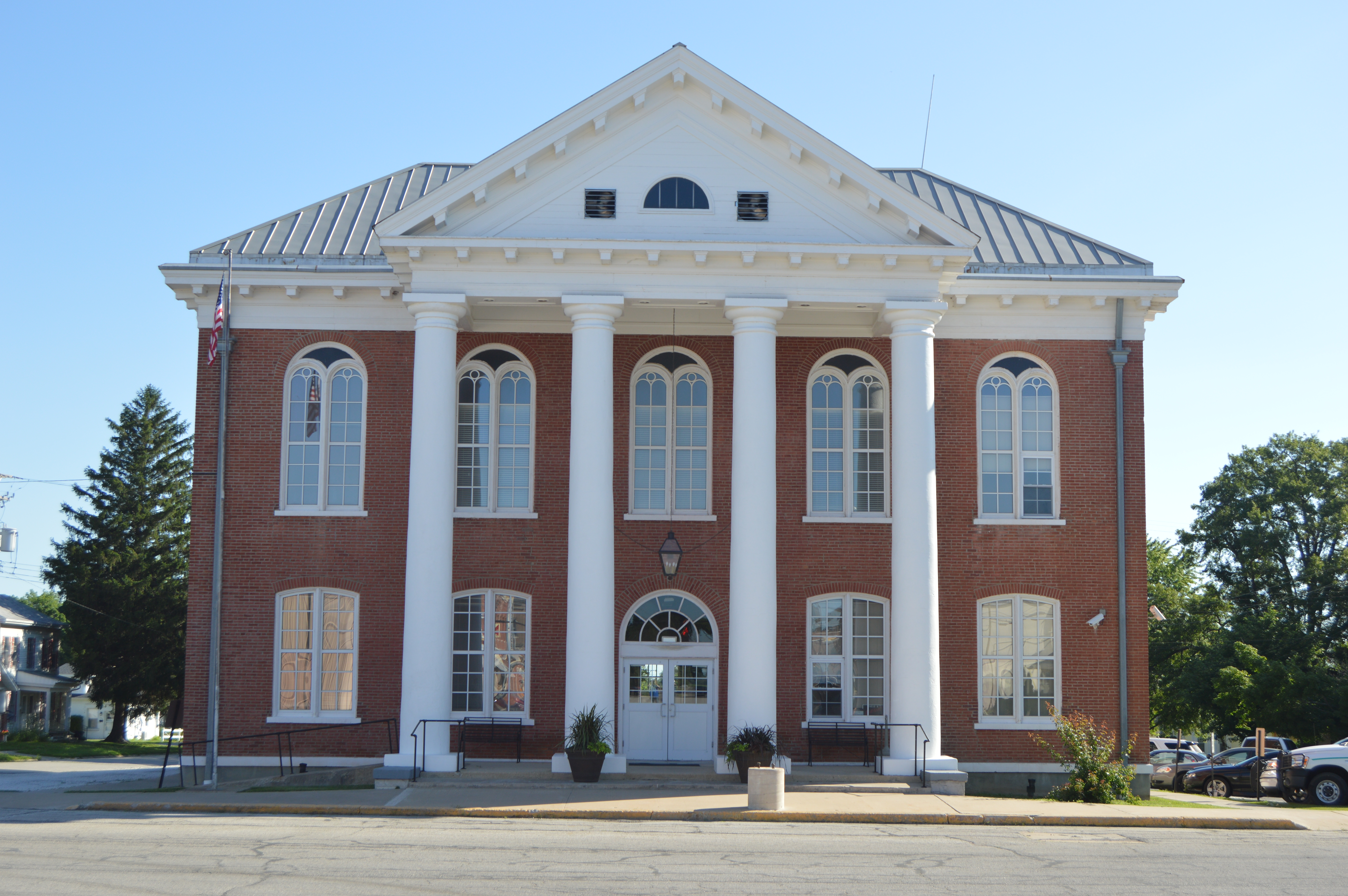
- Brown County Courthouse in Mount Sterling

- Location within the U.S. state of Illinois
- Coordinates: 39°57′N 90°45′W
- Country: United States
- State: Illinois
- Founded: 1839
- Named for: Jacob Brown
- Seat: Mount Sterling
- Largest city: Mount Sterling

Area
  - Total: 307 sq mi (800 km^{2})
  - Land: 306 sq mi (790 km^{2})
  - Water: 1.6 sq mi (4.1 km^{2}) 0.5%

Population (2020)
  - Total: 6,244
  - Estimate (2025): 6,401 ▲
  - Density: 20.4/sq mi (7.88/km^{2})
- Time zone: UTC−6 (Central)
  - Summer (DST): UTC−5 (CDT)
- Congressional district: 15th
- Website: https://www.browncoil.org

Brown County is a county located in the U.S. state of Illinois. As of the 2020 census, the population was 6,244. Its county seat is Mount Sterling. Siloam Springs State Park is located partly in this county.

== History ==
Brown County was formed out of Schuyler County in 1839. It is named in honor of U.S. General Jacob Brown, who defeated the British at the Battle of Sackett's Harbor in 1813.

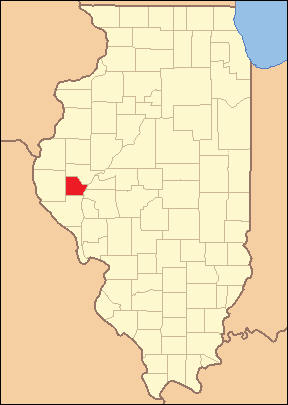
Brown County at the time of its creation in 1839

== Geography ==
According to the U.S. Census Bureau, the county has a total area of 307 square miles (800 km^{2}), of which 306 square miles (790 km^{2}) is land and 1.6 square miles (4.1 km^{2}) (0.5%) is water. The Illinois River flows along part of the county's eastern border.

=== Adjacent counties ===
- Schuyler County - north
- Cass County - east
- Morgan County - southeast
- Pike County - south
- Adams County - west

=== Major highways ===
- US Route 24
- Illinois Route 99
- Illinois Route 107

== Climate and weather ==
Mount Sterling, Illinois

Climate chart (precipitation, max. and min. temperature)
| J | F | M | A | M | J | J | A | S | O | N | D |
| 1.6 32 15 | 1.9 38 20 | 3.1 50 30 | 3.9 63 41 | 5.1 73 51 | 3.9 82 61 | 3.9 87 65 | 3.5 84 63 | 3.6 78 54 | 3.3 66 43 | 3.2 50 31 | 2.4 37 20 |
- █ Average max. and min. temperatures in °F
- █ Precipitation totals in inches
- Source: The Weather Channel
Metric conversion
| J | F | M | A | M | J | J | A | S | O | N | D |
| 39 0 −9 | 48 3 −7 | 77 10 −1 | 99 17 5 | 131 23 11 | 100 28 16 | 98 31 18 | 90 29 17 | 92 26 12 | 83 19 6 | 80 10 −1 | 62 3 −7 |
- █ Average max. and min. temperatures in °C
- █ Precipitation totals in mm

In recent years, average temperatures in the county seat of Mount Sterling have ranged from a low of 15 °F (−9 °C) in January to a high of 87 °F (31 °C) in July, although a record low of −26 °F (−32 °C) was recorded in February 1905 and a record high of 113 °F (45 °C) was recorded in July 1936. Average monthly precipitation ranged from 1.55 inches (39 mm) in January to 5.14 inches (131 mm) in May.

== Demographics ==
2000 census age pyramid for Brown County

Historical population
| Census | Pop. | Note | %± |
|---|---|---|---|
| 1840 | 4,183 | | — |
| 1850 | 7,198 | | 72.1% |
| 1860 | 9,938 | | 38.1% |
| 1870 | 12,205 | | 22.8% |
| 1880 | 13,041 | | 6.8% |
| 1890 | 11,951 | | −8.4% |
| 1900 | 11,557 | | −3.3% |
| 1910 | 10,397 | | −10.0% |
| 1920 | 9,336 | | −10.2% |
| 1930 | 7,892 | | −15.5% |
| 1940 | 8,053 | | 2.0% |
| 1950 | 7,132 | | −11.4% |
| 1960 | 6,210 | | −12.9% |
| 1970 | 5,586 | | −10.0% |
| 1980 | 5,411 | | −3.1% |
| 1990 | 5,836 | | 7.9% |
| 2000 | 6,950 | | 19.1% |
| 2010 | 6,937 | | −0.2% |
| 2020 | 6,244 | | −10.0% |
| 2025 (est.) | 6,401 | ▲ | 2.5% |
U.S. Decennial Census; 1790-1960 1900-1990; 1990-2000 2010

=== 2020 census ===
As of the 2020 census, the county had a population of 6,244. The median age was 40.1 years. 17.4% of residents were under the age of 18 and 15.8% of residents were 65 years of age or older. For every 100 females there were 168.1 males, and for every 100 females age 18 and over there were 190.2 males age 18 and over.

The racial makeup of the county was 76.5% White, 16.9% Black or African American, 0.2% American Indian and Alaska Native, 0.2% Asian, <0.1% Native Hawaiian and Pacific Islander, 3.4% from some other race, and 2.9% from two or more races. Hispanic or Latino residents of any race comprised 4.5% of the population.

<0.1% of residents lived in urban areas, while 100.0% lived in rural areas.

There were 1,959 households in the county, of which 27.5% had children under the age of 18 living in them. Of all households, 49.9% were married-couple households, 21.2% were households with a male householder and no spouse or partner present, and 23.0% were households with a female householder and no spouse or partner present. About 34.5% of all households were made up of individuals and 14.8% had someone living alone who was 65 years of age or older.

There were 2,330 housing units, of which 15.9% were vacant. Among occupied housing units, 76.6% were owner-occupied and 23.4% were renter-occupied. The homeowner vacancy rate was 3.1% and the rental vacancy rate was 9.5%.

=== Racial and ethnic composition ===
Brown County, Illinois – Racial and ethnic composition Note: the US Census treats Hispanic/Latino as an ethnic category. This table excludes Latinos from the racial categories and assigns them to a separate category. Hispanics/Latinos may be of any race.
| Race / Ethnicity (NH = Non-Hispanic) | Pop 1980 | Pop 1990 | Pop 2000 | Pop 2010 | Pop 2020 | % 1980 | % 1990 | % 2000 | % 2010 | % 2020 |
|---|---|---|---|---|---|---|---|---|---|---|
| White alone (NH) | 5,386 | 5,174 | 5,368 | 5,191 | 4,764 | 99.54% | 88.66% | 77.24% | 74.83% | 76.30% |
| Black or African American alone (NH) | 1 | 540 | 1,257 | 1,275 | 1,035 | 0.02% | 9.25% | 18.09% | 18.38% | 16.58% |
| Native American or Alaska Native alone (NH) | 4 | 12 | 6 | 10 | 7 | 0.07% | 0.21% | 0.09% | 0.14% | 0.11% |
| Asian alone (NH) | 2 | 5 | 8 | 16 | 11 | 0.04% | 0.09% | 0.12% | 0.23% | 0.18% |
| Native Hawaiian or Pacific Islander alone (NH) | x | x | 5 | 2 | 0 | x | x | 0.07% | 0.03% | 0.00% |
| Other race alone (NH) | 0 | 1 | 2 | 6 | 2 | 0.00% | 0.02% | 0.03% | 0.09% | 0.03% |
| Mixed race or Multiracial (NH) | x | x | 31 | 35 | 143 | x | x | 0.45% | 0.50% | 2.29% |
| Hispanic or Latino (any race) | 18 | 104 | 273 | 402 | 282 | 0.33% | 1.78% | 3.93% | 5.80% | 4.52% |
| Total | 5,411 | 5,836 | 6,950 | 6,937 | 6,244 | 100.00% | 100.00% | 100.00% | 100.00% | 100.00% |

=== 2010 census ===
As of the 2010 United States census, there were 6,937 people, 2,099 households, and 1,346 families living in the county. The population density was 22.7 inhabitants per square mile (8.8/km^{2}). There were 2,462 housing units at an average density of 8.1 per square mile (3.1/km^{2}). The racial makeup of the county was 76.1% white, 18.5% black or African American, 0.2% Asian, 0.2% American Indian, 4.4% from other races, and 0.6% from two or more races. Those of Hispanic or Latino origin made up 5.8% of the population. In terms of ancestry, 25.5% were German, 15.6% were American, 12.7% were Irish, and 6.1% were English.

Of the 2,099 households, 28.4% had children under the age of 18 living with them, 51.3% were married couples living together, 8.6% had a female householder with no husband present, 35.9% were non-families, and 32.2% of all households were made up of individuals. The average household size was 2.30 and the average family size was 2.88. The median age was 37.3 years.

The median income for a household in the county was $38,696 and the median income for a family was $50,341. Males had a median income of $34,648 versus $27,288 for females. The per capita income for the county was $17,133. About 9.9% of families and 12.0% of the population were below the poverty line, including 15.0% of those under age 18 and 9.2% of those age 65 or over.

The Western Illinois Correctional Center, a state prison located south east of Mount Sterling, has an average daily population of 2,066. The all-male population and racial makeup of the prison is so large compared to the rest of the county, that it skews the census demographic data. This is evidenced by the lopsided age pyramid.

== Communities ==
| Community | Community type | Population | Total Area | Water Area | Land Area | Pop. Density |
|---|---|---|---|---|---|---|
| Mound Station | village | 117 | 0.52 | 0.00 | 0.52 | 225.43 |
| Mount Sterling (seat) | city | 2,006 | 1.11 | 0.00 | 1.11 | 1,810.47 |
| Ripley | village | 53 | 0.38 | 0.00 | 0.38 | 139.84 |
| Versailles | village | 446 | 0.94 | 0.01 | 0.93 | 470 |
| Brown County | county | 6,244 | 307 | 1.6 | 306 | 20 |

=== Townships ===
Brown County is divided into these nine townships:

- Buckhorn
- Cooperstown
- Elkhorn
- Lee
- Missouri
- Mount Sterling
- Pea Ridge
- Ripley
- Versailles

=== Unincorporated communities ===
- Benville
- Buckhorn
- Cooperstown
- Damon
- Fargo
- Hersman
- Jaques
- La Grange
- Morrelville
- Siloam

== Politics ==
Brown County is located in Illinois's 15th Congressional District and is currently represented by Republican Mary Miller. For the Illinois House of Representatives, the county is located in the 93rd district and is currently represented by Republican Norine Hammond. The county is located in the 47th district of the Illinois Senate, and is currently represented by Republican Jil Tracy.

Brown County is part of the German-settled area of western Central Illinois and the Missouri Rhineland centred on the St. Louis metropolitan area. This region was opposed both to southern plantation owners and to anti-slavery Yankees and consequently voted against the majority of people in their state. Brown County voted for the Democratic candidate in every presidential election from at least 1840 through 1948, with the sole exception of the 1928 election when the county voted for the Republican candidate Herbert Hoover. From 1952 to 2024, Democrats have carried Brown County only three times (1964, 1976, and 1992) and have won a majority of the vote only once (1964).

United States presidential election results for Brown County, Illinois
| Year | Republican | | Democratic | | Third party(ies) | |
| Year | No. | % | No. | % | No. | % |
|---|---|---|---|---|---|---|
| 1892 | 879 | 30.89% | 1,567 | 55.06% | 400 | 14.05% |
| 1896 | 1,024 | 32.85% | 2,063 | 66.19% | 30 | 0.96% |
| 1900 | 988 | 32.88% | 1,968 | 65.49% | 49 | 1.63% |
| 1904 | 934 | 38.09% | 1,341 | 54.69% | 177 | 7.22% |
| 1908 | 947 | 35.83% | 1,609 | 60.88% | 87 | 3.29% |
| 1912 | 381 | 16.48% | 1,358 | 58.74% | 573 | 24.78% |
| 1916 | 1,579 | 34.54% | 2,856 | 62.47% | 137 | 3.00% |
| 1920 | 1,590 | 45.08% | 1,866 | 52.91% | 71 | 2.01% |
| 1924 | 1,637 | 41.49% | 2,149 | 54.46% | 160 | 4.05% |
| 1928 | 2,289 | 54.96% | 1,867 | 44.83% | 9 | 0.22% |
| 1932 | 1,148 | 28.75% | 2,822 | 70.67% | 23 | 0.58% |
| 1936 | 1,591 | 34.97% | 2,873 | 63.16% | 85 | 1.87% |
| 1940 | 2,101 | 45.20% | 2,478 | 53.31% | 69 | 1.48% |
| 1944 | 1,738 | 48.18% | 1,849 | 51.26% | 20 | 0.55% |
| 1948 | 1,562 | 46.09% | 1,805 | 53.26% | 22 | 0.65% |
| 1952 | 2,137 | 57.77% | 1,557 | 42.09% | 5 | 0.14% |
| 1956 | 2,026 | 53.67% | 1,748 | 46.30% | 1 | 0.03% |
| 1960 | 1,889 | 50.51% | 1,849 | 49.44% | 2 | 0.05% |
| 1964 | 1,355 | 39.41% | 2,083 | 60.59% | 0 | 0.00% |
| 1968 | 1,629 | 51.50% | 1,265 | 39.99% | 269 | 8.50% |
| 1972 | 1,780 | 58.90% | 1,203 | 39.81% | 39 | 1.29% |
| 1976 | 1,519 | 48.95% | 1,533 | 49.40% | 51 | 1.64% |
| 1980 | 1,660 | 61.66% | 950 | 35.29% | 82 | 3.05% |
| 1984 | 1,478 | 60.43% | 959 | 39.21% | 9 | 0.37% |
| 1988 | 1,373 | 51.89% | 1,267 | 47.88% | 6 | 0.23% |
| 1992 | 1,029 | 38.27% | 1,146 | 42.62% | 514 | 19.11% |
| 1996 | 1,053 | 45.84% | 997 | 43.40% | 247 | 10.75% |
| 2000 | 1,529 | 57.48% | 1,077 | 40.49% | 54 | 2.03% |
| 2004 | 1,679 | 64.95% | 895 | 34.62% | 11 | 0.43% |
| 2008 | 1,544 | 59.91% | 986 | 38.26% | 47 | 1.82% |
| 2012 | 1,513 | 64.00% | 787 | 33.29% | 64 | 2.71% |
| 2016 | 1,796 | 75.49% | 476 | 20.01% | 107 | 4.50% |
| 2020 | 1,931 | 76.48% | 486 | 19.25% | 108 | 4.28% |
| 2024 | 1,938 | 78.62% | 467 | 18.95% | 60 | 2.43% |

== Education ==
School districts include:

- Brown County Community Unit School District 1
- Meredosia-Chambersburg Community Unit School District 11

== See also ==
- National Register of Historic Places listings in Brown County, Illinois
