= Lee Township, Polk County, Iowa =

Township in Polk County, Iowa, U.S.

Coordinates: 41°35′34″N 93°34′12″W

Lee Township is a township in Polk County, Iowa, United States.

Its elevation is listed as 807 feet above mean sea level.

== History ==
Lee Township was established after 1880.
