= Lee Township, Madison County, Iowa =

Township in Madison County, Iowa, U.S.

Lee Township
- Township
- Interactive map of Lee Township
- Coordinates: 41.464°N 93.844°W
- Country: United States
- State: Iowa
- County: Madison
- Established as Badger Township: 1857
- Renamed Lee Township: 1858

Lee Township is a township in Madison County, Iowa, in the United States.

== History ==
Lee Township was originally called Badger Township, and under the latter name was established in 1857. It was renamed Lee in 1858, in honor of Harvey Lee, a pioneer settler.
