= Liberty Community Unit School District 2 =

School district in Illinois, United States

Liberty Community Unit School District 2 (Liberty CUSD 2) is a school district headquartered in Liberty, Illinois. It operates an elementary school and Liberty High School, a combined junior and senior high school.

Much of the district is in Adams County, where it includes the municipality of Liberty, the census-designated places of Beverly and Kingston, and a piece of the Adams CDP. A small piece is in Fairmount Township, Pike County.

== History ==
In 1988 it set a tax rate that was still in use in 2016. Circa 2012 to 2016, according to the superintendent, Kelle Bunch, the district attempted to cut costs while the state did not adequately fund the district. According to Bunch, in 2016, the district asked voters for a tax increase because it could not cut any more reasonable expenses. The state had increasingly sent less money to the district, and the district in response did budget cuts. In November 2014 there was a proposal to increase taxes by 75 cents, but voters did not approve it.

The group Vote Yes for Liberty Schools advocated for the proposed tax increase in 2016.

== School Data ==
Liberty Community Unit School District 2 has approximately 267 students. 30% of the student body has free or reduced lunch. The student to teacher ration is 10.5:1.
