= Siloam Springs State Park =

State park in Illinois, United States

- IUCN category III (natural monument or feature)
- Location within Illinois Location within the United States
- Location: Adams and Brown counties, Illinois, United States
- Nearest city: Clayton, Illinois
- Coordinates: 39°52′59″N 90°55′31″W
- Area: 3,323 acres (1,345 ha)
- Established: 1940
- Governing body: Illinois Department of Natural Resources

Siloam Springs State Park is an Illinois state park on 3,323 acres (1,345 ha) in Adams and Brown counties, Illinois, United States. Siloam is an unincorporated community in the park.

== History ==
Siloam Springs State Park land was originally part of the military tract of western Illinois set aside to be given to combat veterans. In 1852, George Meyers acquired the land for his service in the Black Hawk War and Mexican War. He died in 1882 at the age of 102.

The name Siloam Springs came from a biblical reference, christened by Rev. Reuben K. McCoy, a Presbyterian minister from Clayton, Illinois. Local legend held that the spring water in the area had a medicinal effect. In the 1800s, visitors came to the five mineral springs.

After Meyers' death, Quincy Burgesser, a local businessman and stock dealer, had the water analyzed and discovered it had a higher mineral content of magnesium, iron, and sulfur than water from the famous healing springs of Eureka Springs, Arkansas and Waukesha, Wisconsin. Burgesser touted the water's ability to cure almost all ailments, even drunkenness and drug addiction to morphine and opium.

Water from the Number Two spring was bottled and distributed by the Wabash Railroad as far west as Kansas City, and bottling became a flourishing business for several decades. In the 1890s, Siloam businessman J. B. House sold the water and shipped it cross-country by rail for $3 per barrel, with an additional $2 surcharge if he had to provide the barrel.

=== The Forest Hotel ===
Burgesser began building a mineral springs resort hotel in 1882. The Siloam Springs Company was founded in 1883 to operate the property. By 1884 he had erected two buildings, a bathing house and the Siloam Forest Home Hotel. The Siloam Forest Hotel, also known as the Siloam Forest Home Hotel, contained 40 rooms in its three-story structure. The L-shaped hotel had balconies, a ballroom, full kitchen facilities, tennis courts, and croquet grounds. In May 1887, a three-day grand opening attracted guests from as far as Colorado.

Notable guests of the hotel included Charles Edward Ringling, P. T. Barnum, and E. I. DuPont.

The hotel closed from 1912 to 1915. In 1924, the hotel manager C. S. Johnson purchased the property from the Siloam Springs Company. However, the era of springs resorts was winding down.

In 1934, J. S. Harwood purchased the property at a tax sale and renovated it. He operated it for two seasons before selling.

In 1935, the Siloam Springs Recreation Club purchased the site in an effort to restore it and provide local recreation. Citizens of Adams and Brown counties raised money to match state funds. The hotel was renovated in 1937.

=== State Recreation Area ===
By 1940, it was made into a state recreation area. The state decided not to maintain the old structures and they were torn down for lumber by 1943. The hewn stone foundation of the hotel is still visible in the present-day. The No. 2 spring house was rebuilt in 1995 and contains the most popular spring.

Between October 1954 and August 1955, an earthen dam was constructed across a deep ravine and the 58-acre lake was created from the waters of Crabapple Creek, a branch of McKee Creek. The lake has a maximum depth of 45 feet. This lake was the second in Illinois built from the Dingle-Johnson Act funds.

Siloam Springs was dedicated as a state park in 1956.

== Geology ==
The park has flatlands, forested gullies, steep wooded valleys, ridge tops, and scenic crests. The rough topography is carved by the McKee Creek and its tributaries, eroding the Illinois glacial drift to reveal Pennsylvanian and Mississippian rocks.

== Flora and Fauna ==
The deciduous woodlands consist of white oak, red oak, and shagbark hickory timber with some interspersed brushy, fallow pasture areas. Other tree species include sassafras, ironwood, rock maple, and post oak.

Some of the floral species include: goldenrod, asters, wild roses, black-eyed Susans, white false indigo, and snapdragons. Grasses and shrubs include smooth sumac, prairie willow, Indian grass, and bluestem.

Siloam Springs State Park is home for several species native to Illinois: deer, wild turkeys, squirrels, rabbits, and raccoons.

The lake is stocked with several species of fish, including largemouth bass, bluegill, redear, carp, crappie, channel catfish, walleye, and rainbow trout.

== Recreation ==
Hunting, fishing, camping, boating, picnicking, hiking, equestrian trails, and bird watching are some of the activities available at Siloam Springs State Park. There are over 15 miles of hiking trails.
