= Mound Station, Illinois =

Mound Station, Illinois Timewell
- Village
- Motto: "Time Spent In Timewell Is Time Well Spent"
- Coordinates: 40°0′24″N 90°52′35″W
- Country: United States
- State: Illinois
- County: Brown
- Township: Lee Township, Brown County, Illinois
- Incorporated: December 23, 1901

Area
  - Total: 0.52 sq mi (1.34 km^{2})
  - Land: 0.52 sq mi (1.34 km^{2})
  - Water: 0 sq mi (0.00 km^{2})
- Elevation: 751 ft (229 m)

Population (2020)
  - Total: 117
  - Estimate (2024): 119 ▲
  - Density: 225.6/sq mi (87.12/km^{2})
- Time zone: UTC-6 (CST)
  - Summer (DST): UTC-5 (CDT)
- ZIP code: 62375
- Area code: 217
- FIPS code: 17-50790
- GNIS feature ID: 2399405

Mound Station (Timewell) is a village in Lee Township, Brown County, Illinois, United States. The population was 117 at the 2020 census.

== Geography ==
According to the 2021 census gazetteer files, Mound Station has a total area of 0.52 square miles (1.35 km^{2}), all land.

Mound Station is located at the intersection of U.S. Route 24 and County Route 2.

== History ==
Mound Station was established as a post office in 1860; the Village of Mound Station incorporated December 23, 1901. In 1903, the post office name changed to Timewell, to avoid confusion with the town of Mounds, Illinois. The Timewell name has supplanted the original name of Mound Station in local use, but the legal village name has never changed. Thus legal references in U.S. Census Bureau products as well as lists from the Illinois Secretary of State's Office continue to show Mound Station, while the local Post Office continues as Timewell.

== Demographics ==
Historical population
Census	Pop.	Note	%±
1880	196		—
1890	219		11.7%
1900	178		−18.7%
1910	194		9.0%
1920	267		37.6%
1930	234		−12.4%
1940	226		−3.4%
1950	184		−18.6%
1960	204		10.9%
1970	203		−0.5%
1980	175		−13.8%
1990	147		−16.0%
2000	127		−13.6%
2010	122		−3.9%
2020	117		−4.1%
U.S. Decennial Census

As of the 2020 census there were 117 people, 54 households, and 46 families residing in the village. The population density was 225.43 inhabitants per square mile (87.04/km^{2}). There were 53 housing units at an average density of 102.12 per square mile (39.43/km^{2}). The racial makeup of the village was 94.02% White, 0.85% Asian, and 5.13% from two or more races. Hispanic or Latino of any race were 1.71% of the population.

There were 54 households, out of which 31.5% had children under the age of 18 living with them, 70.37% were married couples living together, 3.70% had a female householder with no husband present, and 14.81% were non-families. 12.96% of all households were made up of individuals, and 9.26% had someone living alone who was 65 years of age or older. The average household size was 2.76 and the average family size was 2.61.

The village's age distribution consisted of 41.1% under the age of 18, 20.6% from 18 to 24, 12.7% from 25 to 44, 19.1% from 45 to 64, and 6.4% who were 65 years of age or older. The median age was 23.8 years. For every 100 females, there were 98.6 males. For every 100 females age 18 and over, there were 144.1 males.

The median income for a household in the village was $70,625, and the median income for a family was $73,750. Males had a median income of $45,313 versus $34,063 for females. The per capita income for the village was $24,252. About 13.0% of families and 10.6% of the population were below the poverty line, including 15.5% of those under age 18 and none of those age 65 or over.
