= Versailles, Illinois =

- Village
- Village of Versailles
- Location of Illinois in the United States
- Coordinates: 39°53′2″N 90°39′27″W
- Country: United States
- State: Illinois
- County: Brown
- Township: Versailles

Government
  - Mayor: Dave Hoelscher

Area
  - Total: 0.94 sq mi (2.43 km^{2})
  - Land: 0.93 sq mi (2.42 km^{2})
  - Water: 0.0039 sq mi (0.01 km^{2})
- Elevation: 610 ft (190 m)

Population (2020)
  - Total: 446
  - Estimate (2024): 454 ▲
  - Density: 477/sq mi (184/km^{2})
- Time zone: UTC-6 (CST)
  - Summer (DST): UTC-5 (CDT)
- ZIP Code(s): 62378
- Area code: 217
- FIPS code: 17-77720
- GNIS feature ID: 2400067
- Wikimedia Commons: Versailles, Illinois
- Website: villageofversailles.com

Versailles is a village in Versailles Township, Brown County, Illinois, United States. The population was 336 at the 2020 census. The village's name is pronounced differently from the French city of the same name: /vərˈseɪlz/ vər-SAYLZ.

== Geography ==
Versailles is located at 39°53′2″N 90°39′27″W (39.883896, -90.657630).

According to the 2021 census gazetteer files, Versailles has a total area of 0.94 square miles (2.43 km^{2}), of which 0.93 square miles (2.41 km^{2}) (or 99.47%) is land and 0.01 square miles (0.03 km^{2}) (or 0.53%) is water.

== Demographics ==
Historical population
Census	Pop.	Note	%±
1880	517		—
1890	517		0.0%
1900	524		1.4%
1910	557		6.3%
1920	627		12.6%
1930	515		−17.9%
1940	590		14.6%
1950	472		−20.0%
1960	427		−9.5%
1970	429		0.5%
1980	513		19.6%
1990	480		−6.4%
2000	567		18.1%
2010	478		−15.7%
2020	446		−6.7%
U.S. Decennial Census

As of the 2020 census there were 446 people, 183 households, and 109 families residing in the village. The population density was 475.48 inhabitants per square mile (183.58/km^{2}). There were 250 housing units at an average density of 266.52 per square mile (102.90/km^{2}). The racial makeup of the village was 96.86% White, 0.67% African American, and 2.47% from two or more races. Hispanic or Latino of any race were 0.45% of the population.

There were 183 households, out of which 22.4% had children under the age of 18 living with them, 54.64% were married couples living together, 4.92% had a female householder with no husband present, and 40.44% were non-families. 38.80% of all households were made up of individuals, and 21.31% had someone living alone who was 65 years of age or older. The average household size was 3.10 and the average family size was 2.32.

The village's age distribution consisted of 24.1% under the age of 18, 0.7% from 18 to 24, 29.2% from 25 to 44, 24.5% from 45 to 64, and 21.5% who were 65 years of age or older. The median age was 37.9 years. For every 100 females, there were 106.8 males. For every 100 females age 18 and over, there were 96.3 males.

The median income for a household in the village was $49,375, and the median income for a family was $62,083. Males had a median income of $53,015 versus $27,679 for females. The per capita income for the village was $24,881. About 9.2% of families and 12.0% of the population were below the poverty line, including 3.9% of those under age 18 and 26.4% of those age 65 or over.

== Notable people ==
- Thomas Ford, 8th Governor of Illinois; hometown in Versailles
- Bill Roy, skeet shooting Olympian and world champion; born in Versailles
