= Liberty, Illinois =

- Village
- Location of Liberty in Adams County, Illinois.
- Coordinates: 39°52′39″N 91°6′25″W
- Country: US
- State: Illinois
- County: Adams
- Township: Liberty

Area
  - Total: 0.39 sq mi (1.01 km^{2})
  - Land: 0.39 sq mi (1.01 km^{2})
  - Water: 0 sq mi (0.00 km^{2})
- Elevation: 758 ft (231 m)

Population (2020)
  - Total: 543
  - Estimate (2024): 523 ▼
  - Density: 1,390/sq mi (538/km^{2})
- Time zone: UTC-6 (CST)
  - Summer (DST): UTC-5 (CDT)
- ZIP code: 62347
- Area code: 217
- FIPS code: 17-43133
- GNIS feature ID: 2398433

Liberty is a village in Adams County, Illinois, United States. The population was 543 at the 2020 census. It is part of the Quincy, IL–MO Micropolitan Statistical Area.

== History ==
Liberty Township began with the first settlement made on Section 28, by Daniel Lile, in the spring of 1822, and many old settlers followed about the same time. The first regular preacher was George Wolfe of the Dunkard denomination. First horse mill was built by Daniel Lile. The first marriage was that of Jacob Waggle to a Miss Hunsaker, by the Rev. George Wolfe, at the house of the bride's father. The first birth and death, was an infant child of Mr. Kimbrick. The first Supervisor was David Wolfe.

== Geography ==
According to the 2021 census gazetteer files, Liberty has a total area of 0.39 square miles (1.01 km^{2}), all land.

Liberty is 78 miles (126 km) west of Springfield, Illinois, the state capital, and 97 miles (156 km) northwest of St. Louis.

== Demographics ==
Historical population
Census	Pop.	Note	%±
1880	218		—
1970	369		—
1980	587		59.1%
1990	541		−7.8%
2000	519		−4.1%
2010	516		−0.6%
2020	543		5.2%
U.S. Decennial Census

As of the 2020 census there were 543 people, 140 households, and 107 families residing in the village. The population density was 1,388.75 inhabitants per square mile (536.20/km^{2}). There were 227 housing units at an average density of 580.56 per square mile (224.16/km^{2}). The racial makeup of the village was 94.48% White, 0.74% African American, 1.10% from other races, and 3.68% from two or more races. Hispanic or Latino of any race were 1.84% of the population.

There were 140 households, out of which 49.3% had children under the age of 18 living with them, 59.29% were married couples living together, 17.14% had a female householder with no husband present, and 23.57% were non-families. 23.57% of all households were made up of individuals, and 16.43% had someone living alone who was 65 years of age or older. The average household size was 3.35 and the average family size was 2.84.

The village's age distribution consisted of 30.4% under the age of 18, 5.5% from 18 to 24, 23.8% from 25 to 44, 19.4% from 45 to 64, and 20.9% who were 65 years of age or older. The median age was 40.8 years. For every 100 females, there were 78.5 males. For every 100 females age 18 and over, there were 81.0 males.

The median income for a household in the village was $63,333, and the median income for a family was $70,804. Males had a median income of $41,000 versus $28,333 for females. The per capita income for the village was $23,995. No families and 1.8% of the population were below the poverty line, including none of those under age 18 and 8.4% of those age 65 or over.

The rate of college-level education in Liberty is quite a bit lower than the national average among all cities of 14.96%: just 10.26% of people here over 25 have a bachelor's degree or an advanced degree.

The per capita income in Liberty in 2000 was $18,682, which is middle income relative to Illinois and the nation. This equates to an annual income of $74,728 for a family of four.

The people who call Liberty home come from a variety of different races and ancestries. Important ancestries of people in Liberty include German, English, and Irish.

In Liberty, about 62% of adults are married.

Because occupations involving physical labor dominate the local economy, Liberty is generally considered to be a blue-collar town. 35.9% of the Liberty workforce is employed in blue-collar occupations, compared to the national average of 24.7%. Overall, Liberty is a town of sales and office workers, service providers, and professionals. Many people living in Liberty work in office and administrative support jobs (14.82%), sales jobs (8.99%), and farm management (6.91%).

== Education ==
It is in the Liberty Community Unit School District 2.

Liberty High School is located at 505 N. Park Street and serves grades 6 through 12. Enrollment is 318 students. Liberty Elementary School, also located at 505 N. Park Street, serves pre-kindergarten through fifth grade. Enrollment is 264 students.
