= Ripley, Illinois =

- Village
- Location of Ripley in Brown County and Illinois
- Coordinates: 40°01′31″N 90°38′17″W
- Country: United States
- State: Illinois
- County: Brown
- Township: Ripley

Area
  - Total: 0.38 sq mi (0.98 km^{2})
  - Land: 0.38 sq mi (0.98 km^{2})
  - Water: 0 sq mi (0.00 km^{2})
- Elevation: 541 ft (165 m)

Population (2020)
  - Total: 53
  - Estimate (2024): 51 ▼
  - Density: 140.0/sq mi (54.04/km^{2})
- Time zone: UTC-6 (CST)
  - Summer (DST): UTC-5 (CDT)
- ZIP code: 62353
- Area code: 217
- FIPS code: 17-64174
- GNIS feature ID: 2399080

Ripley is a village in Ripley Township, Brown County, Illinois, United States, located along the La Moine River. The population was 53 according to the 2020 census.

== History ==
Ripley was originally named Centerville. It was originally incorporated on July 20, 1837, and then reincorporated on April 10, 1874. The Illinois Secretary of State issued Ripley's certificate of incorporation on April 16, 1902. Ripley's native clay made it a center for the manufacture of stoneware.

== Geography ==
According to the 2021 census gazetteer files, Ripley has a total area of 0.38 square miles (0.98 km^{2}), all land.

== Demographics ==
Historical population
| Census | Pop. | Note | %± |
|---|---|---|---|
| 1880 | 418 | | — |
| 1890 | 304 | | −27.3% |
| 1900 | 298 | | −2.0% |
| 1910 | 234 | | −21.5% |
| 1920 | 193 | | −17.5% |
| 1930 | 168 | | −13.0% |
| 1940 | 173 | | 3.0% |
| 1950 | 177 | | 2.3% |
| 1960 | 167 | | −5.6% |
| 1970 | 159 | | −4.8% |
| 1980 | 149 | | −6.3% |
| 1990 | 103 | | −30.9% |
| 2000 | 103 | | 0.0% |
| 2010 | 86 | | −16.5% |
| 2020 | 53 | | −38.4% |
U.S. Decennial Census

As of the 2020 census there were 53 people, 27 households, and 17 families residing in the village. The population density was 139.84 inhabitants per square mile (53.99/km^{2}). There were 31 housing units at an average density of 81.79 per square mile (31.58/km^{2}). The racial makeup of the village was 94.34% White, and 5.66% from two or more races. Hispanic or Latino of any race were 3.77% of the population.

There were 27 households, out of which 14.8% had children under the age of 18 living with them, 55.56% were married couples living together, 7.41% had a female householder with no husband present, and 37.04% were non-families. 37.04% of all households were made up of individuals, and 29.63% had someone living alone who was 65 years of age or older. The average household size was 2.24, and the average family size was 1.78.

The village's age distribution consisted of 12.5% under the age of 18, 0.0% from 18 to 24, 14.6% from 25 to 44, 27.1% from 45 to 64, and 45.8% who were 65 years of age or older. The median age was 64.3 years. For every 100 females, there were 100.0 males. For every 100 females age 18 and over, there were 110.0 males.

The median income for a household in the village was $26,250. Males had a median income of $38,750 versus $30,625 for females. The per capita income for the village was $18,996. About 11.8% of families and 12.5% of the population were below the poverty line, including 33.3% of those under age 18 and 9.1% of those age 65 or over.
