= Brown County Community Unit School District 1 =

School district in Illinois, United States

Location
- Mount Sterling, Illinois; United States
- Coordinates: 39°58′57″N 90°45′06″W

District information
- Type: Unified school district
- Grades: K to 12
- Established: 1947; 79 years ago
- Superintendent: Dr. Lan Eberle
- NCES District ID: 1727300

Students and staff
- Enrollment: 724 (2020-2021)
- Faculty: 55.5 (on an FTE basis)
- Student–teacher ratio: 13.8
- Athletic conference: IHSA
- District mascot: Hornet
- Colors: Kelly Green, White and Gold

Other information
- Website: www.bchornets.com

Brown County Community Unit School District 1 is a unified school district located in Mount Sterling, the county seat of Brown County, Illinois; it was created out of sixty-seven individual school districts and one parochial school.

Today, the district has three schools: Brown County Elementary School, Brown County Middle School, and Brown County High School. The current superintendent is Vicki Phillips, and the mascot of the school is the Hornet.

== History ==
Brown County Community Unit School District 1 was created, as previously mentioned, out of sixty-seven school districts and one private parochial school; with the passing of the School Survey Law through the government of the state of Illinois, a committee was formed in Brown County to evaluate and, if necessary, reorganize the schools in the county. After their survey was completed, the committee proposed to consolidate the elementary school districts of Brown County into one. This was subsequently passed via referendum on May 16, 1947, although the legislature proceeded to permit the consolidation of all schools in the county into one district one month later. J. Russell Morris was chosen as the first superintendent of the district.

The plan to reorganize the educational districts of Brown County included the construction of new K-8 schools in Mount Sterling, as well as the surrounding villages of Versailles and Ripley and the unincorporated areas of Cooperstown, Timewell, and Hersman. Slowly, the one-room school houses that originally housed the students of the county closed down as they were replaced by the newer five schools set up in accordance to what the reorganization effort entailed. They had disappeared entirely by 1953.
