= Mount Sterling, Illinois =

- City
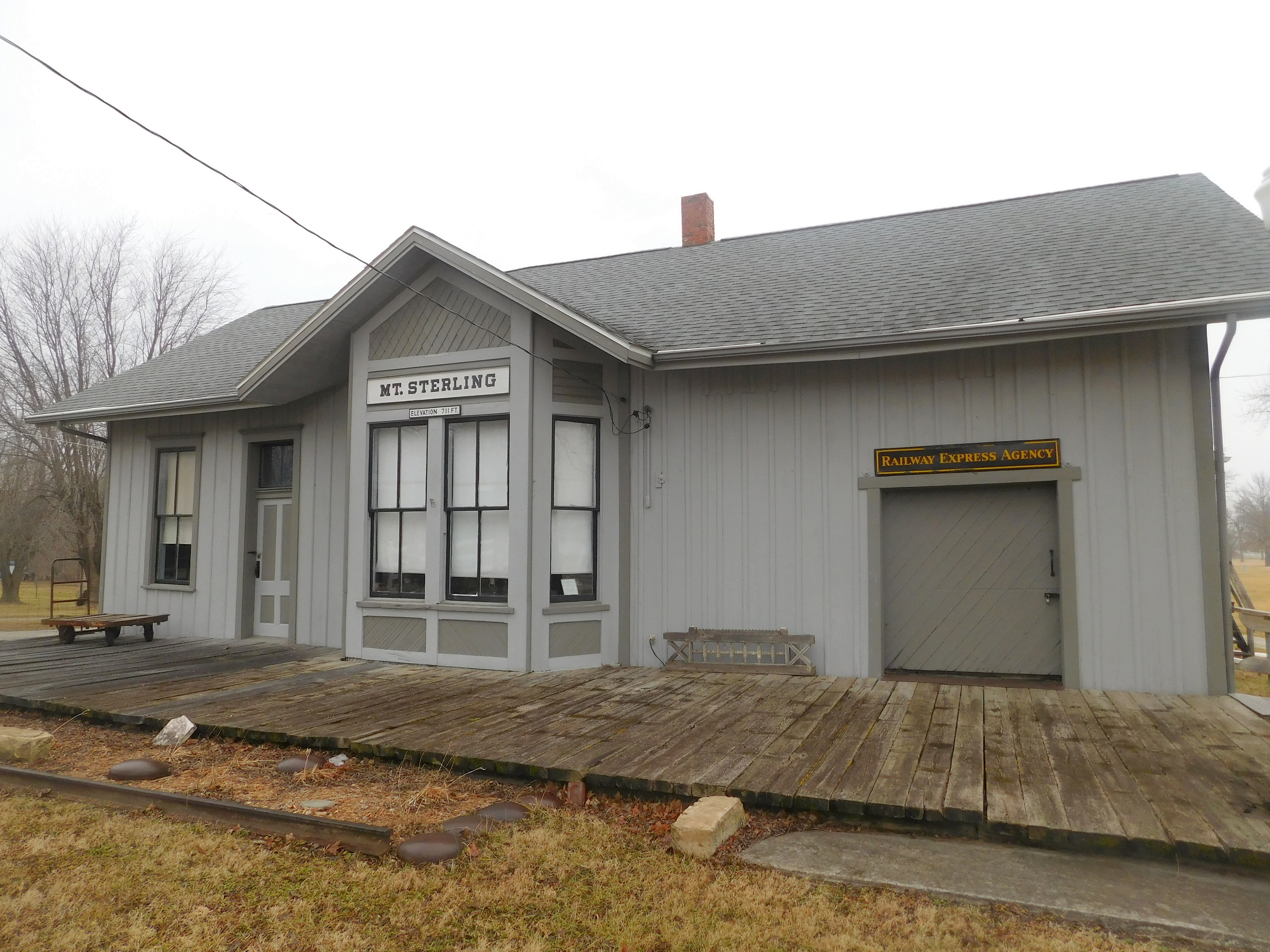
- Former train station in Mount Sterling

- Logo
- Interactive map of Mount Sterling, Illinois
- Location within Illinois Location within the United States
- Coordinates: 39°59′12″N 90°45′55″W
- Country: United States
- State: Illinois
- County: Brown
- Township: Mount Sterling

Government
  - Mayor: Billie Burge

Area
  - Total: 1.11 sq mi (2.87 km^{2})
  - Land: 1.11 sq mi (2.87 km^{2})
  - Water: 0 sq mi (0.00 km^{2}) 0%
- Elevation: 735 ft (224 m)

Population (2020)
  - Total: 2,006
  - Estimate (2024): 2,031 ▲
  - Density: 1,810.0/sq mi (698.86/km^{2})
- Time zone: UTC-6 (CST)
  - Summer (DST): UTC-5 (CDT)
- ZIP Code(s): 62353
- Area code: 217
- FIPS code: 17-51154
- GNIS feature ID: 2395125
- Wikimedia Commons: Mount Sterling, Illinois
- Website: browncountyil.org/mtsterling/

Mount Sterling is a city in and the county seat of Brown County, Illinois, United States. The population was 2,006 at the 2020 census.

== History ==
Mount Sterling was organized in 1854. It did not have a courthouse until 1868, although it was designated the county seat from when the county was organized.

Mount Sterling was one of several Illinois towns that publicly competed for a new state prison in one of the state's prison sweepstakes competitions. During the 1987 competition, the town of Flora famously produced the "Is We Is or Is We Isn't/Gonna Get Ourselves A Prison" video. Ultimately, Mount Sterling won the 1987 competition and the state constructed the Western Illinois Correctional Center along State Highway 99 a mile south of town. In 1989 immediately prior to opening, the prison hosted a "Spend a night in prison" event for state and local dignitaries and prominent business-owners, an event that ultimately soured some of its participants on the economic value of prisons to small town economies.

Dot Foods, based in Mount Sterling, is the largest foodservice distribution company in the country and one of the 50 largest privately held companies.

== Geography ==
According to the 2021 census gazetteer files, Mount Sterling has a total area of 1.11 square miles (2.87 km^{2}), all land.

== Demographics ==
Historical population
Census	Pop.	Note	%±
1850	556		—
1870	1,352		—
1880	1,445		6.9%
1890	1,655		14.5%
1900	1,960		18.4%
1910	1,986		1.3%
1920	1,932		−2.7%
1930	1,724		−10.8%
1940	2,140		24.1%
1950	2,246		5.0%
1960	2,262		0.7%
1970	2,182		−3.5%
1980	2,186		0.2%
1990	1,922		−12.1%
2000	2,070		7.7%
2010	2,025		−2.2%
2020	2,006		−0.9%
U.S. Decennial Census

=== Racial and ethnic composition ===
Mount Sterling city, Illinois – Racial and ethnic composition Note: the US Census treats Hispanic/Latino as an ethnic category. This table excludes Latinos from the racial categories and assigns them to a separate category. Hispanics/Latinos may be of any race.
Race / Ethnicity (NH = Non-Hispanic)	Pop 2000	Pop 2010	Pop 2020	% 2000	% 2010	% 2020
White alone (NH)	2,027	1,965	1,874	97.92%	97.04%	93.42%
Black or African American alone (NH)	3	9	25	0.14%	0.44%	1.25%
Native American or Alaska Native alone (NH)	0	2	2	0.00%	0.10%	0.10%
Asian alone (NH)	6	9	5	0.29%	0.44%	0.25%
Native Hawaiian or Pacific Islander alone (NH)	3	1	0	0.14%	0.05%	0.00%
Other race alone (NH)	0	3	0	0.00%	0.15%	0.00%
Mixed race or Multiracial (NH)	11	15	69	0.53%	0.74%	3.44%
Hispanic or Latino (any race)	20	21	31	0.97%	1.04%	1.55%
Total	2,070	2,025	2,006	100.00%	100.00%	100.00%

=== 2020 census ===
As of the 2020 census, Mount Sterling had a population of 2,006. The median age was 37.6 years. 25.1% of residents were under the age of 18 and 17.0% of residents were 65 years of age or older. For every 100 females there were 91.0 males, and for every 100 females age 18 and over there were 89.5 males age 18 and over.

0.0% of residents lived in urban areas, while 100.0% lived in rural areas.

There were 841 households in Mount Sterling, of which 27.5% had children under the age of 18 living in them. Of all households, 37.6% were married-couple households, 23.4% were households with a male householder and no spouse or partner present, and 32.5% were households with a female householder and no spouse or partner present. About 43.2% of all households were made up of individuals and 15.7% had someone living alone who was 65 years of age or older.

There were 989 housing units at an average density of 892.60 per square mile (344.63/km^{2}), of which 15.0% were vacant. The population density was 1,810.47 inhabitants per square mile (699.03/km^{2}). The homeowner vacancy rate was 3.9% and the rental vacancy rate was 10.2%.

Racial composition as of the 2020 census
Race	Number	Percent
White	1,875	93.5%
Black or African American	25	1.2%
American Indian and Alaska Native	5	0.2%
Asian	5	0.2%
Native Hawaiian and Other Pacific Islander	0	0.0%
Some other race	6	0.3%
Two or more races	90	4.5%

=== Income and poverty ===
The median income for a household in the city was $45,536, and the median income for a family was $73,693. Males had a median income of $43,019 versus $31,469 for females. The per capita income for the city was $24,433. About 6.4% of families and 12.8% of the population were below the poverty line, including 12.6% of those under age 18 and 7.0% of those age 65 or over.

== Education ==
Mount Sterling is home to Brown County Community Unit School District 1, which contains an elementary school, middle school, and Brown County High School. The sports teams for the district are referred to as the "Hornets".
