= Illinois Route 103 =

State highway in Schuyler County, Illinois, US

Illinois Route 103
- IL 103 highlighted in red

Route information
- Maintained by IDOT
- Length: 9.18 mi (14.77 km)
- Existed: 1924–present

Major junctions
- West end: US 24 in Ripley
- East end: US 67 / IL 100 in Frederick

Location
- Country: United States
- State: Illinois
- Counties: Schuyler

Highway system
- Illinois State Highway System; Interstate; US; State; Tollways; Scenic
← IL 102	→ IL 104

Illinois Route 103 (IL 103) is a 9.18-mile-long (14.77 km) state route in west-central Illinois, United States. The route, entirely in Schuyler County, runs from U.S. Route 24 (US 24) near Ripley east to the intersection of US 67 and IL 100 across the Illinois River from Beardstown. In addition to connecting Ripley and Beardstown, IL 103 serves the community of Sugar Grove. The highway is part of both the National Highway System and the Lincoln Heritage Trail. It is maintained by the Illinois Department of Transportation. The route was established in 1924 between Ripley and its current eastern terminus; its western terminus was moved north to its current location in 1932.

== Route description ==
Route 103 begins at a junction with U.S. Route 24 in Woodstock Township in southern Schuyler County, northeast of Ripley. The route follows the LaMoine River eastward, passing through a forested area. After the river turns to the south, the highway continues east through farmland. Route 103 intersects County Route 9 before entering the unincorporated community of Sugar Grove, where it meets County Route 1. After passing through Sugar Grove, the highway enters Bainbridge Township, where it makes a small southward dip through a tree-lined area. After passing a small group of buildings and crossing a creek, the route returns to its eastward trajectory and passes north of the community of Cottonwood. Route 103 runs through open farmland at the eastern end of its route, crossing two creeks and passing several farm buildings. The highway ends at a junction with U.S. Route 67 and Illinois Route 100, across the Illinois River from Beardstown.

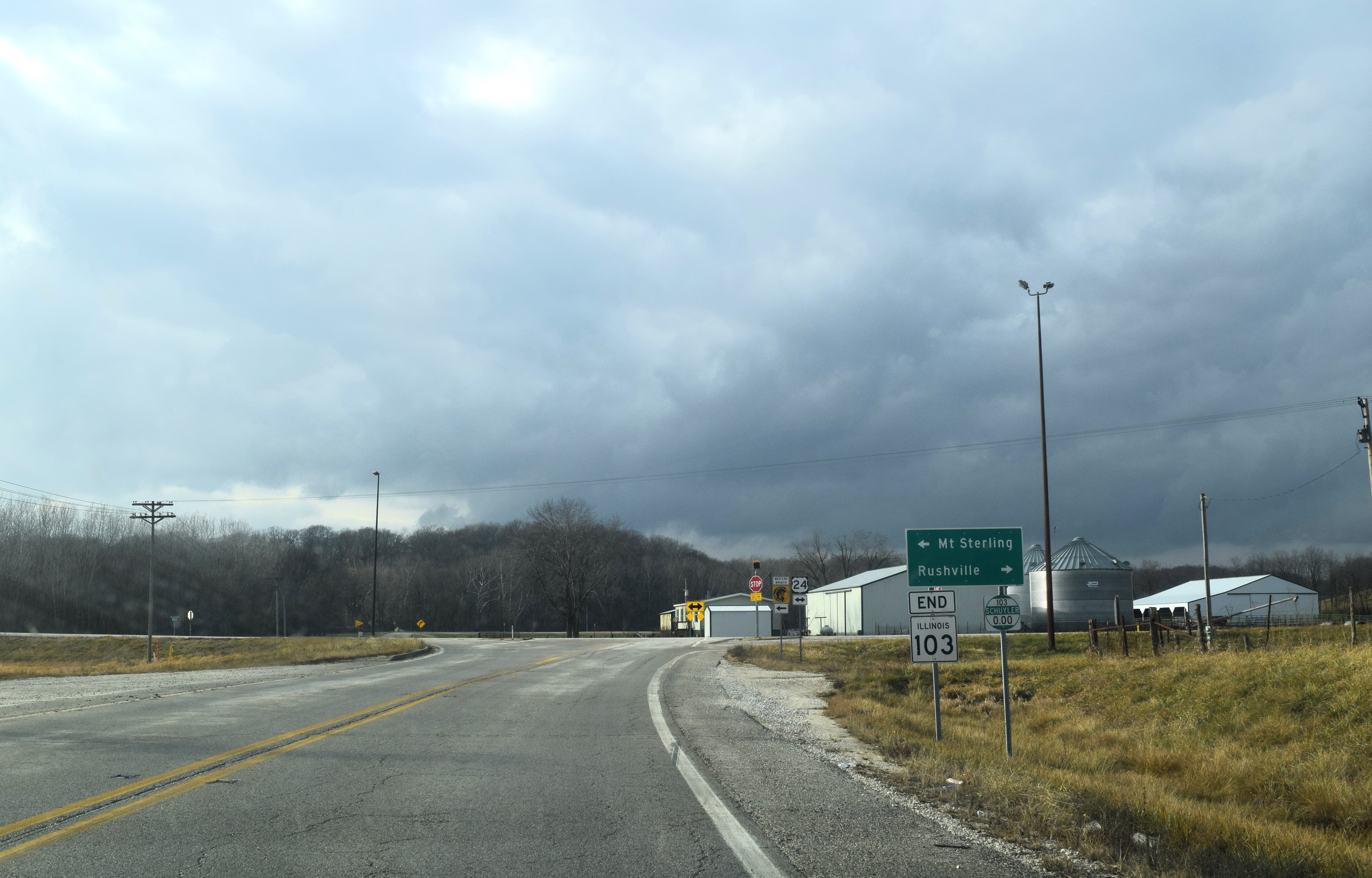
Western terminus of Route 103 at US 24

Route 103 is an undivided two-lane road for its entire length. The entire route is part of the National Highway System, a network of roads deemed significant to the nation's economy, defense, and mobility. It is also part of the Lincoln Heritage Trail, a series of highways connecting places with historic connections to Abraham Lincoln. According to the Illinois Department of Transportation, the annual average daily traffic on Route 103 in 2019 ranged from 1250 vehicles near the western terminus to 1400 on its eastern half; 70 of those vehicles were trucks.

== History ==
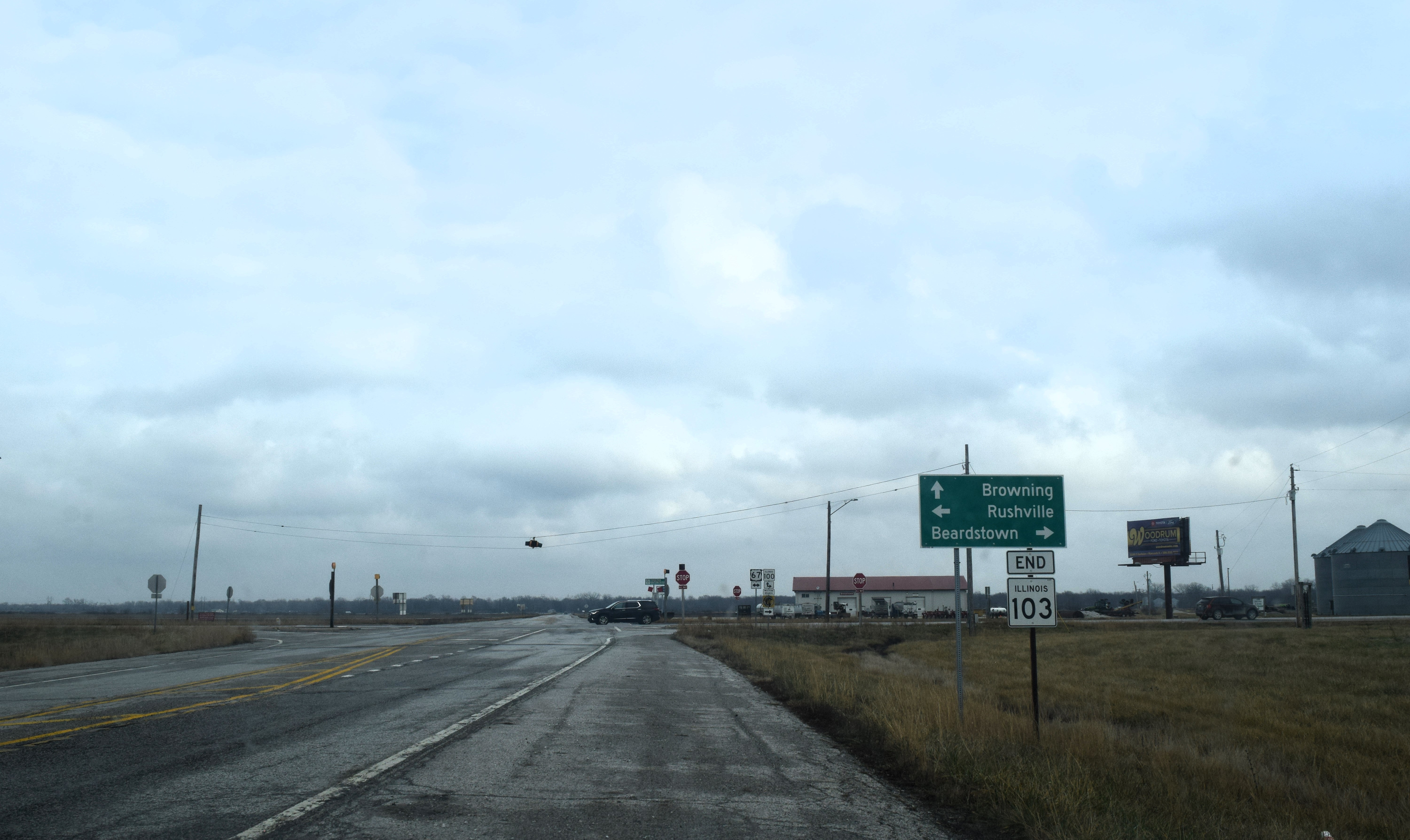
Eastern terminus of Route 103

The State of Illinois designated Route 103 in 1924 between Ripley and Beardstown. A road between Ripley and the route's current eastern terminus was first marked on state highway maps in 1924; this route began at Ripley and ran parallel to and south of the current route on its western half, before turning north and following the eastern half of the current alignment. Route 103 was first numbered on the 1929 Illinois highway map. The western terminus of Route 103 moved from Ripley to its current location in 1932, shifting the western half of the highway to its present alignment. The community of Layton, which was near Sugar Grove, was marked along the route until 1951.

== Major intersections ==
The entire route is in Schuyler County.

Location	mi	km	Destinations	Notes
Woodstock Township	0.00	0.00	US 24 / Lincoln Heritage Trail (Western Branch)	Western terminus
Bainbridge Township	9.18	14.77	US 67 / IL 100 / Lincoln Heritage Trail (Western Branch)	Eastern terminus
1.000 mi = 1.609 km; 1.000 km = 0.621 mi
