= Bader, Illinois =

- Unincorporated community
- Location within Illinois Location within the United States
- Coordinates: 40°10′23″N 90°22′07″W
- Country: United States
- State: Illinois
- County: Schuyler
- Township: Browning
- Elevation: 617 ft (188 m)
- Time zone: UTC-6 (Central (CST))
  - Summer (DST): UTC-5 (CDT)
- Postal code: 62624
- Area code: 217 309
- GNIS feature ID: 403793

Bader is an unincorporated community in Schuyler County, Illinois, United States. Bader is 3 miles (4.8 km) north of Browning. The community was founded in 1870 under the name Osceola; it was later renamed after William Bader, who ran a grain elevator in the community. A post office opened in the community on October 8, 1872, under the name Baders; it was shortened to Bader on December 23, 1907.

== Notable people ==
- Evangelist Jesse Moren Bader (1886–1963) was born in Bader.
- MLB pitcher Lore Bader (1888–1973), who played for the New York Giants and Boston Red Sox, was born in Bader.
