= Jesse Moren Bader =

- Born: 15 April 1885
- Died: August 19 1963
- Spouse: Golda Maud Elam (Married 1911-1963)

Jesse Moren Bader (1886–1963) was a 20th-century evangelist and ecumenist. He was an evangelical leader who played a role in the establishment of the World Convention of Churches of Christ.

== Youth ==
Jesse Bader was born on April 15, 1886 in Bader, Illinois. His family was actively involved in the Christian Church (Disciples) in Bader. When Bader was four years old, his family moved to Coffey County, Kansas, where he lived until he was nineteen. In 1897, Clara H. Hazelrigg was ordained and she subsequently was the pastor who converted Bader.

In 1905, he enrolled at the University of Kansas with plans to study medicine, but he instead found a calling to ministry, partly as a result of his role as a student minister in the nearby town of Perry. After two years of study, he moved to Drake University in Des Moines, Iowa. Drake University was founded in principles historically affiliated with the Christian Church, and allowed him to pursue studies in preparation for ministry.

== Marriage ==
At Drake University, Bader met Golda Maud Bader (née Elam). They got married in 1911 during Bader's last year at Drake, and they remained married for more than fifty years. She was born September 6, 1885 to Edward E. Elam and Lillie Elam (née Jones), and died in February of 1981. Golda Maud Bader was a leader in the United Church Women (now Church Women United) and the Protestant Motion Picture Council. She was also involved with Japan International Christian University and the American Bible Society. Bader née Elam was an ordained minister and held associate pastor positions in two of the churches that the Baders belonged to.

== First Ministry ==
Bader's first full-time ministry was at First Christian Church, in Atchison, Kansas. During his seven years there, the membership grew from around 300 to 1400. Bader emphasized the role of lay people in evangelism with the slogan, "Each one win one". In Atchison, he was a member of the masonic Washington Lodge no.5. (see William Denslow - 10,000 Famous Freemasons, Macoy Publishing & Masonic Supply Co., Richmond, Virginia, 1957). He resigned from the church in Atchison in 1917, which was at the time adding a member each day, when the USA entered World War I, to become a YMCA secretary with the armed forces. From 1918 to 1919 he served with the 35th Division in France, and at the end of the war, he was one of several selected for a preaching mission among the American forces in Germany.

== Jackson Avenue Christian Church ==
After his return to the United States in 1920, Bader became the pastor of Jackson Avenue Christian Church in Kansas City, Missouri, which after his death was renamed Bader Memorial Christian Church. Coinciding with the beginning of this ministry, he drafted a proposal for a five-year evangelistic program, titled 'Win a Million', for the International Convention of Disciples of Christ, the national assembly of Christian Churches in the USA and Canada at that time. According to his writings, Bader had developed a passion for the centrality and prioritization of evangelism in the ministry of the church, saying in a well-known quote, 'What the Lord made primary, we have no right to make secondary.'

== Superintendent of Evangelism ==
In 1920, Bader became Superintendent of Evangelism in the newly established United Christian Missionary Society, a position he held for the next twelve years. He travelled throughout the Christian Church (Disciples) family in the United States and Canada, contributing to the church communities. He also became the head of the major UCMS 'home missionary' program.

== World Convention of the Churches of Christ ==
While Bader was working with the UCMS, his interest was growing in the Christian World Communion that he belonged to the 'Stone-Campbell family'. This global family had churches with the same origins and traditions using the names 'Christian Churches', 'Churches of Christ', or 'Disciples of Christ'. Baptists, Congregationalists, Lutherans, Methodists and Presbyterians had all established global conventions and a means of cooperating or acting globally. Bader attended the meeting of the Baptist World Alliance in 1925, and, according to his writings, began to consider how this concept might develop for his Stone-Campbell family. He canvassed suggestions amongst leaders in several countries, including Australia, Canada, New Zealand and the United Kingdom, receiving strong support. In October 1930, with attendance from around the world, the first World Convention of Churches of Christ was held in Washington, D.C., USA. Up to 10,000 people attended, and the program featured an afternoon tea at the White House hosted by President Herbert Hoover and the First Lady. 'World Convention' was firmly established. Bader became the first president (1930–35) and was also appointed as the first general secretary, a post he held until his death, working part-time until his retirement and then graduating to full-time work. Conventions were held every five years until 1970, though the pattern was interrupted by World War II, and currently continue every four years.

On the subject, Bader wrote in 1930, "While preaching unity to others, our churches around the world have too often neglected to practice unity and promote a closer fellowship amongst themselves".

== Department of Evangelism for the Federal Council of Churches of Christ in America ==
In 1932, Bader moved from his denominational position to become Associate Executive Secretary of the Department of Evangelism for the Federal Council of Churches of Christ in America. The Executive Secretary was Dr. Charles L. Goodell, a figure who many considered well-respected in his community. Dr. Goodell saw Bader as a successor for himself in his retirement and proposed that he be invited to become his associate. Samuel McCrea Cavert, General Secretary of the Federal Council, was to discuss the matter with Bader, and wrote of his surprise at Bader's hesitation, noting, "I still have vivid memories of my conversation with him at a long-drawn-out breakfast in the Severin Hotel in Indianapolis. To my surprise, he had some hesitation in accepting the invitation. He needed assurance that the Federal Council would give evangelism enough emphasis to provide the best base for his enthusiasm. He was, however, quick to see the future possibilities in the united program that the Council could develop as an official agency of cooperating churches" (Herald of the Evangel, page 18).

For the next twenty-two years until his retirement, Bader continued in this position and a similar position in the National Council of Churches of Christ in the USA, which succeeded the Federal Council in 1950, providing evangelistic leadership for the member churches and their local communities.

== Influence ==
Evangelistic staffing of the Councils under Bader's leadership increased from one full-time person to seven. It became, according to Daniel L Poling, "the most dynamic and largest department" of the Federal Council. Evangelism was said to receive "adequate emphasis" among the council. Denominational evangelistic leadership showed further growth; In 1932 only two denominations (Presbyterian and Bader's own) had full-time secretaries of evangelism. In 1956, Bader recorded that there were 46 secretaries of evangelism in 35 Protestant communions. Evangelism had apparently become central in the life of the churches.

Bader's influence extends to the number of inter-church nationwide programs he led. In his time in leadership, Bader maintained a dozen evangelist programs, such as the National Preaching Mission, the University Christian Mission, the National Christian Teaching Mission, and ministry in National Parks (where visitor numbers increased to 15 million each year in the 1950s) and the missions to the American Forces during World War II. Likely due to Bader's influence, local cooperation among churches grew significantly through this time, in contrast with earlier more competitive denominationalism.

== Contributions to the Evangelistic Life of Churches ==
Bader placed emphasis his perceived importance of 'Visitation evangelism'. Visitation evangelism, or proselytizing by making private visits to the people being converted, was a method of sharing the gospel and disciplining that had been in effect in the twentieth century, with many denominational leaders contributing to its development. The Department of Evangelism of the Federal Council of Churches officially adopted visitation evangelism and recommended it to all churches under its influence. Visitation evangelism stressed the idea that all Christians should spread their faith to those who did not follow it, and it provided a method to achieve this mass conversion. In 1946 and 1947, an emphasis was placed on this form of proselytization. Visitation not only added to the sizes of the church, it was said to have strengthened the faith of those members taking part. As visitation evangelism was interdenominational, it also gave the church a further sense of unity.

Furthermore, Bader contributed to the formation of the religious census, which tallied opinions and data about churchgoers. Bader believed that it was essential to know people's church preferences, as he thought this knowledge was needed to be obtained by churches working together in order to visit house to house. The technique he created required careful processes and months of preparation. As society was becoming much more mobile, Bader and the people he worked with believed that the data needed to be put into action quickly.

The Annual Universal Week of Prayer (now Week of Prayer for Christian Unity) held in January also received Bader's interest and encouragement. In the United States of America, his department sponsored this emphasis. Bader states that churches in local communities could do no better than to begin the year by sharing fellowship and prayer. Prayer would, as he affirmed, provide the focus for all that was planned. Although Bader and other evangelists recognized that large revival meetings were not the most effective form of outreach, they nevertheless received his support.

Bader was a friend and consultant for the young Billy Graham and his team. Bader was proud of the transparency of the public accounting of the Graham organizations.

== World Communion Sunday ==
Bader has been recognized as the founder of the global, ecumenical World Communion Sunday, which was launched on October 6, 1940, and continues on the first Sunday in October each year. Bader was aware of the Worldwide Communion Sunday of the Presbyterian Church, first celebrated in 1936, which was designed to strengthen Presbyterian global fellowship. During 1939, he brought a recommendation to the Department of Evangelism of the Federal Council of Churches, proposing the observance of a world wide, church wide communion Sunday. The recommendation was approved. Although the World Council of Churches felt unable to take up the promotion of this project, Henry Smith Leiper, who was Associate General Secretary when the World Council was in process of formation, sent out many letters encouraging participation. This was a considerable contribution to the establishment of World Communion Sunday globally. The emphasis on World Communion Sunday had never been on combining services for communion, something that is still not possible in many situations, but rather on all churches and congregations celebrating communion on that day. The purpose of this focus was to provide Christian communities with a sense of unity and togetherness.

== Leadership ==
From 1937 onwards, Bader attended all major ecumenical gatherings related to the formation and establishment of the World Council of Churches including Oxford and Edinburgh (1937), Amsterdam (1948), Evanston (1954), New Delhi (1961), and the annual meetings of the World Council of Churches executive committee once it was set up in 1948. In 1962, on behalf of the World Convention, he represented the global family of Churches of Christ/Disciples of Christ at the Vatican Council.

== Book ==
During 1956, two years after his retirement on December 31, 1953, Bader wrote his first and only book - Evangelism in a Changing America (The Bethany Press, 1957). In the introduction, David S. McNelly wrote, "He has outthought, outworked, and outloved his contemporaries, to turn the tide of religion in America towards a great revival. His passion for evangelism, his zeal for ecumenicity, his compassion for the misguided, and his love on behalf of the unlovely, as well as his concern for the unconcerned, has excelled in every circle on the American scene. Dr Bader has moved across America and many kindred nations in the last quarter of a century, breathing the evangelistic spirit of life into the church, making bold the Great Commission of Jesus Christ. ... today many patterns of evangelism used by the American church were pioneered, perfected and promoted first by Dr. Bader. He … has done as much as any living man to establish a climate for evangelism in America today." Bader had been a pioneer in promoting the idea that evangelism and ecumenism went hand in hand, as opposed to being mutually exclusive. The final chapter of the book, Evangelism Together, stresses that, although there is a place for churches to focus on their own evangelism, some evangelism must be done together. Bader claimed that this idea was formed from his own lived experiences.

== Retirement ==
Following his official retirement at the end of 1953, Bader became the full-time General Secretary for the World Convention of Churches of Christ, what he called a "spare time" activity of his since 1930. In the week leading up to his death, he had expected to be in San Juan, Puerto Rico, preparing for the 1965 World Convention there. He died after a brief illness in New York City, on August 19, 1963. Bader was 77 years old. His funeral was held at First Christian Church, Atchison, Kansas. An interdenominational memorial service was held at The Interchurch Center in New York and several other memorial services were held in Christian Churches around the United States. His death was also marked at the next World Convention in Puerto Rico in 1965. In honor of Bader's contributions, the permanent lecture series World Convention established in his name is entitled 'The Bader Lectures in Evangelism'.

== Bibliography ==
- Herald of the Evangel, edited by Edwin T. Dahlberg. (Essays in a memorial volume.)
- Hull, Debra B. (1994). Christian Church Women. Chalice Press. p. 35. ISBN 978-0-8272-0580-2.
- Evangelism in a Changing America, by Jesse M Bader
- Convention handbooks (World Convention).
