= Huntsville Township =

Huntsville Township may refer to the following townships in the United States:

- Huntsville Township, Polk County, Minnesota
- Huntsville Township, Schuyler County, Illinois
