= Sheldons Grove, Illinois =

- Unincorporated community
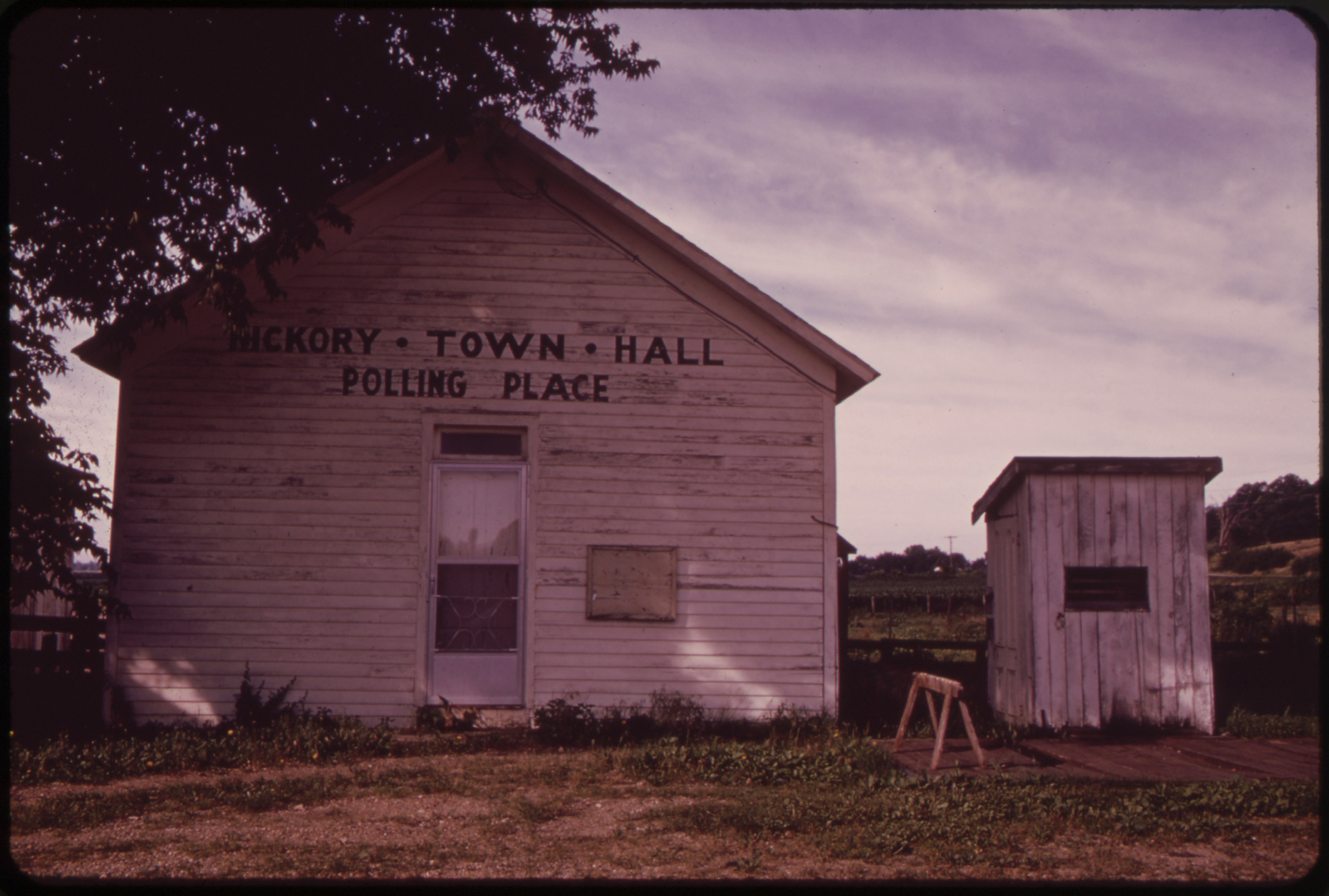
- Hickory Township hall, 1973

- Location within Illinois Location within the United States
- Coordinates: 40°10′00″N 90°17′39″W
- Country: United States
- State: Illinois
- County: Schuyler
- Elevation: 466 ft (142 m)
- Time zone: UTC-6 (Central (CST))
  - Summer (DST): UTC-5 (CDT)
- Area code: 217
- GNIS feature ID: 418340

Sheldons Grove is an unincorporated community in Hickory Township, Schuyler County, Illinois, United States. Sheldons Grove is located on Illinois Route 100, 5 miles (8.0 km) east-northeast of Browning.
