= Bluff City, Schuyler County, Illinois =

Bluff City, Illinois
- Unincorporated community
- Location within Illinois Location within the United States
- Coordinates: 40°10′49″N 90°13′49″W
- Country: United States
- State: Illinois
- County: Schuyler
- Elevation: 449 ft (137 m)
- Time zone: UTC-6 (Central (CST))
  - Summer (DST): UTC-5 (CDT)
- Area code: 217
- GNIS feature ID: 404616

Bluff City is an unincorporated community in Hickory Township, Schuyler County, Illinois, United States. Bluff City is located on Illinois Route 100, 8.5 miles (13.7 km) east-northeast of Browning.
