= Rushville Township =

Rushville Township may refer to the following townships in the United States:

- Rushville Township, Schuyler County, Illinois
- Rushville Township, Rush County, Indiana
