= Schuyler County Courthouse (Illinois) =

Local government building in the United States

Coordinates: 40°7′14″N 90°33′50″W

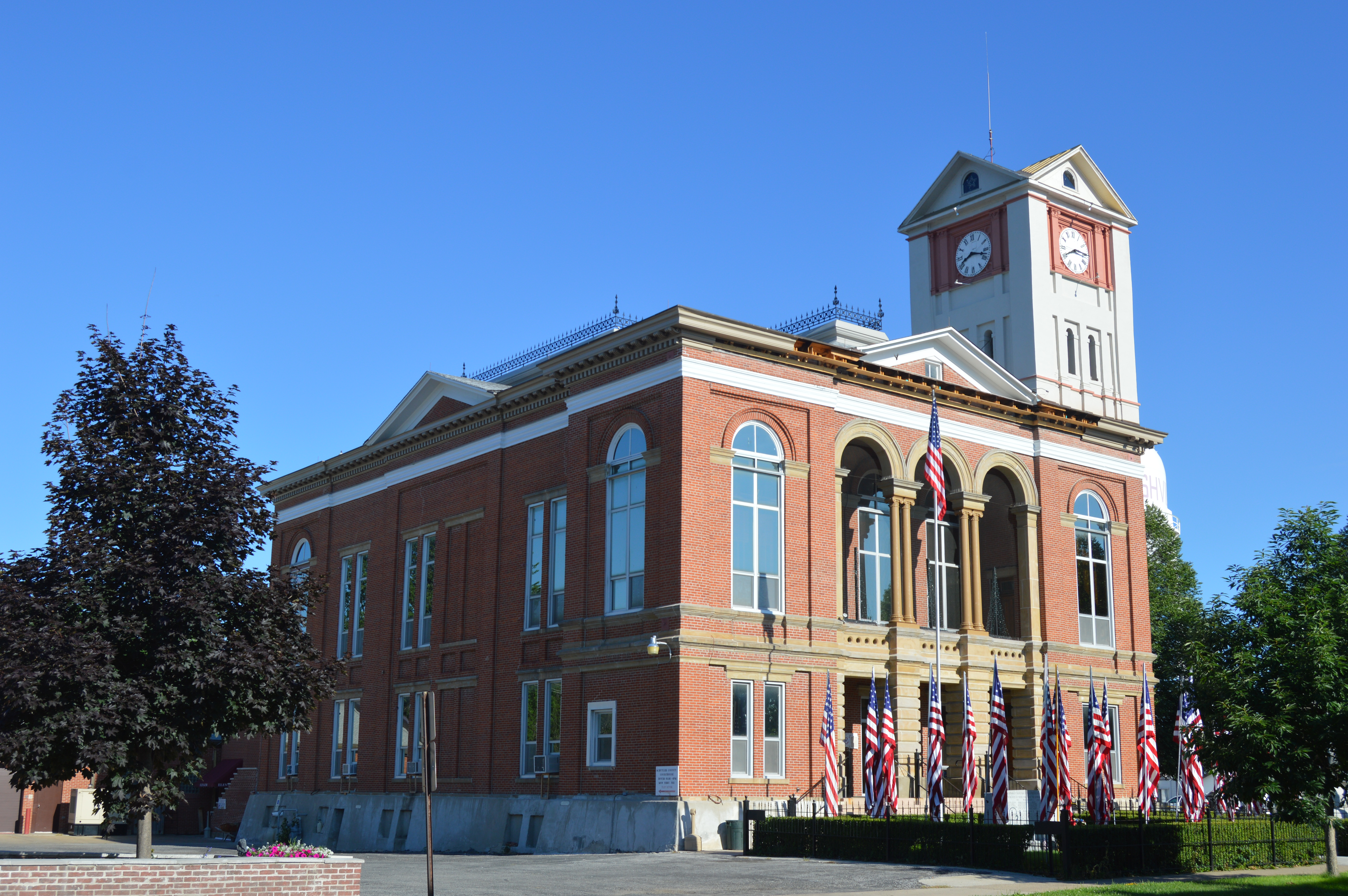
Looking northwest from Congress Street

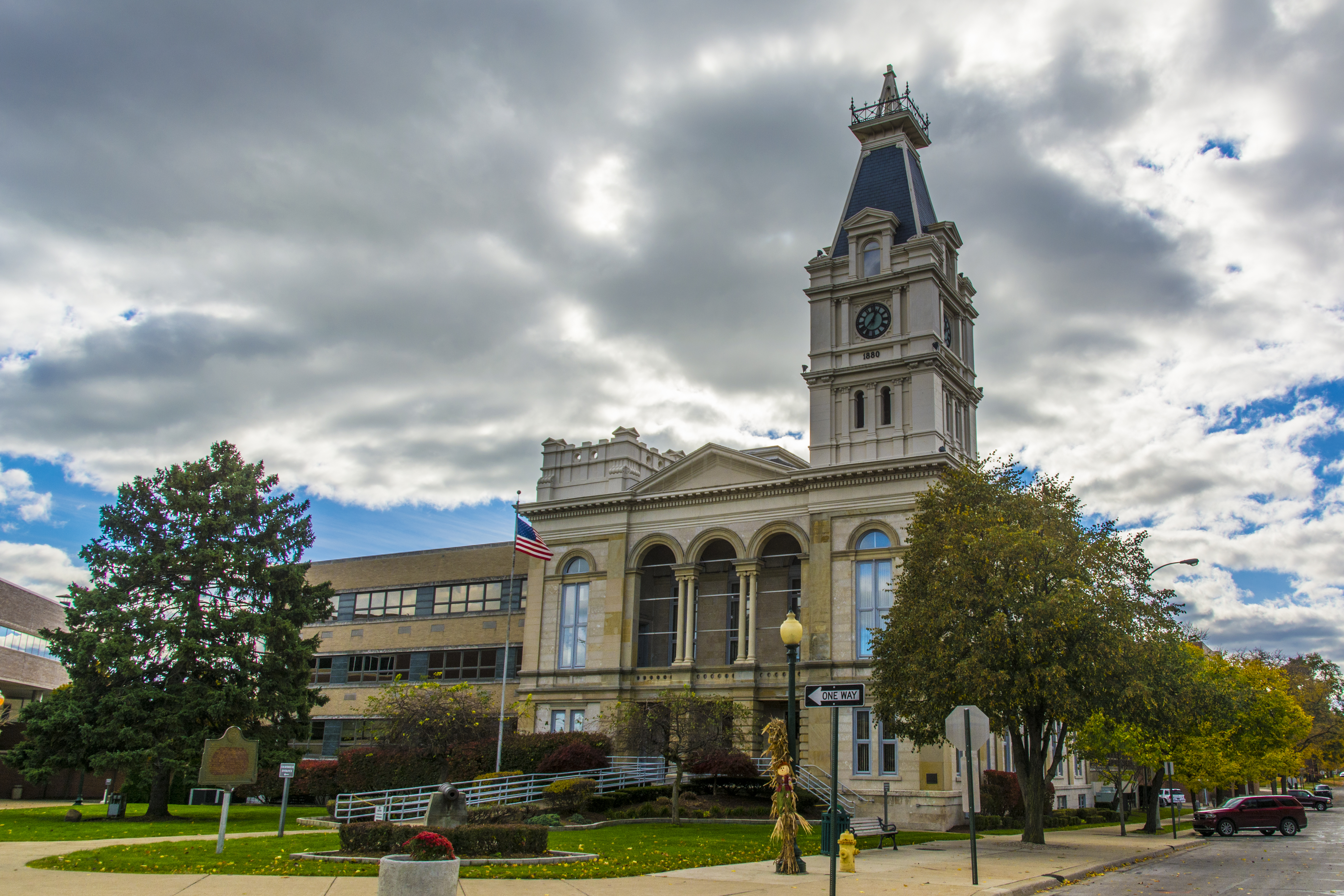
When built, the courthouse strongly resembled Michigan's Monroe County Courthouse

The Schuyler County Courthouse is a government building in Rushville, the county seat of Schuyler County, Illinois, United States. Completed in 1882, it is the third courthouse in the county's history.

Schuyler County was organized in 1825 from part of Pike County, and a commission chose a location in what is now far southern Rushville Township to become the new county seat. Difficulties arising with the location, an act of the General Assembly was procured to permit the re-location of the seat; this action was performed in early 1826, and the new settlement was named "Rushville" in honor of Benjamin Rush. A log courthouse was erected in Rushville in late 1826, 14 by 16 feet (4.3 m × 4.9 m) and 10 feet (3.0 m) high. However, this building soon because unsatisfactory, and a replacement brick structure was finished in 1830.

The brick courthouse remained in use for slightly over half a century, but by 1880 the building had become dilapidated, and county officials chose to borrow the plans of the Monroe County Courthouse in Michigan to build their own courthouse. Construction on this building finished in mid-1882 at a cost of $36,000. In its early years, the two-story building featured a central arcade surrounding the entrance, a clock tower with spire on one corner, and short square towers on other corners.

The courthouse's present appearance dates from the 1990s, following a storm that forced the removal of the spire. Most of the interior resembles its original appearance: modernization projects in the 1970s greatly modified the interior, but the damage was repaired two decades later. Observing that a skilled roofer was to be imprisoned for a crime, a local judge instead sentenced him to work on restoring the interior, assisted by juvenile offenders who were capable of performing simple tasks. With the aid of labor donated by other local residents, the project was completed at zero cost to the county.
