= Hickory Township, Schuyler County, Illinois =

Coordinates: 40°10′11″N 90°16′18″W

Hickory Township
- Township
- Location in Schuyler County

- Schuyler County's location in Illinois
- Country: United States
- State: Illinois
- County: Schuyler
- Established: November 8, 1853

Area
  - Total: 18.59 sq mi (48.1 km^{2})
  - Land: 17.69 sq mi (45.8 km^{2})
  - Water: 0.9 sq mi (2.3 km^{2}) 4.84%

Population (2010)
  - Estimate (2016): 142
  - Density: 8.7/sq mi (3.4/km^{2})
- Time zone: UTC-6 (CST)
  - Summer (DST): UTC-5 (CDT)
- FIPS code: 17-169-34462

Hickory Township is located in Schuyler County, Illinois. As of the 2010 census, its population was 154 and it contained 78 housing units.

== Geography ==
According to the 2010 census, the township has a total area of 18.59 square miles (48.1 km^{2}), of which 17.69 square miles (45.8 km^{2}) (or 95.16%) is land and 0.9 square miles (2.3 km^{2}) (or 4.84%) is water.

It is bordered by Fulton County, Illinois, to the north; by the Illinois River to the east and south; and by Browning Township to the west.

=== Unincorporated communities ===
- Bluff City
- Sheldons Grove

== Demographics ==
Historical population
| Census | Pop. | Note | %± |
|---|---|---|---|
| 2016 (est.) | 142 |
U.S. Decennial Census
