= Browning Township, Illinois =

Browning Township, Illinois may refer to:

- Browning Township, Franklin County, Illinois
- Browning Township, Schuyler County, Illinois
