= Lore Bader =

American baseball player (1888–1973)

- Pitcher
- Born: April 27, 1888; Bader, Illinois, U.S.
- Died: June 2, 1973 (aged 85); LeRoy, Kansas, U.S.
- Batted: Left Threw: Right

MLB debut
- September 30, 1912, for the New York Giants

Last MLB appearance
- July 18, 1918, for the Boston Red Sox

MLB statistics
- Win–loss record: 5–3
- Earned run average: 2.51
- Strikeouts: 27
- Stats at Baseball Reference

Teams
- New York Giants (1912); Boston Red Sox (1917–1918)

Career highlights and awards
- World Series champion (1918)

Lore Verne Bader (April 27, 1888 – June 2, 1973) was an American baseball pitcher in Major League Baseball who played for the New York Giants (1912) and Boston Red Sox (1917–1918). Bader batted left-handed and threw right-handed. He was born in Bader, Illinois. In a three-season career, Bader posted a 5–3 record with 27 strikeouts and a 2.51 ERA in 75.1 innings pitched.

== Career ==
In 1912, Bader pitched in two games for the New York Giants. In his debut, on September 30, he pitched a complete game, 4–2 victory over the Philadelphia Phillies and their staff ace Grover Cleveland Alexander, foiling Alexander's bid for his 20th victory of the season. After that, Bader played for the Buffalo minor league team, and went 16-7 In 1914, 20–18 in 1915, and in 1916 topped the league pitchers with a 23–8 mark.

Bader returned to the major leagues with the Boston Red Sox in 1917. He ended 2–0 with a 2.37 ERA in 15 games, all but one in relief. He enlisted in the Navy at the end of the season, but was discharged in June 1918 because of loose knee ligaments. He rejoined the Red Sox for the rest of the year and played his last game on July 18.

Following his majors career, Bader pitched with the Toronto Maple Leafs of the International League in 1920 and 1923 and was a pitcher-manager with the Lynn, Massachusetts team of the New England League in 1926. He also worked as a Boston Braves scout in 1927, and managed the Hartford, Connecticut club in the Eastern League in 1930.

== Personal ==
Bader died in LeRoy, Kansas, aged 85.

Nicknamed "King", Bader was also known as "Two Pairs" because he loved playing cards.

== Sources ==
- 1918 Red Sox
- Baseball Almanac
- Baseball Library
- Career statistics from Baseball Reference, or Baseball Reference (Minors)
- Buffalo Bisons History
