= Mark Mitchell Bassett =

Civil War veteran, judge and Illinois legislator (1837–1910)

Mark M. Bassett
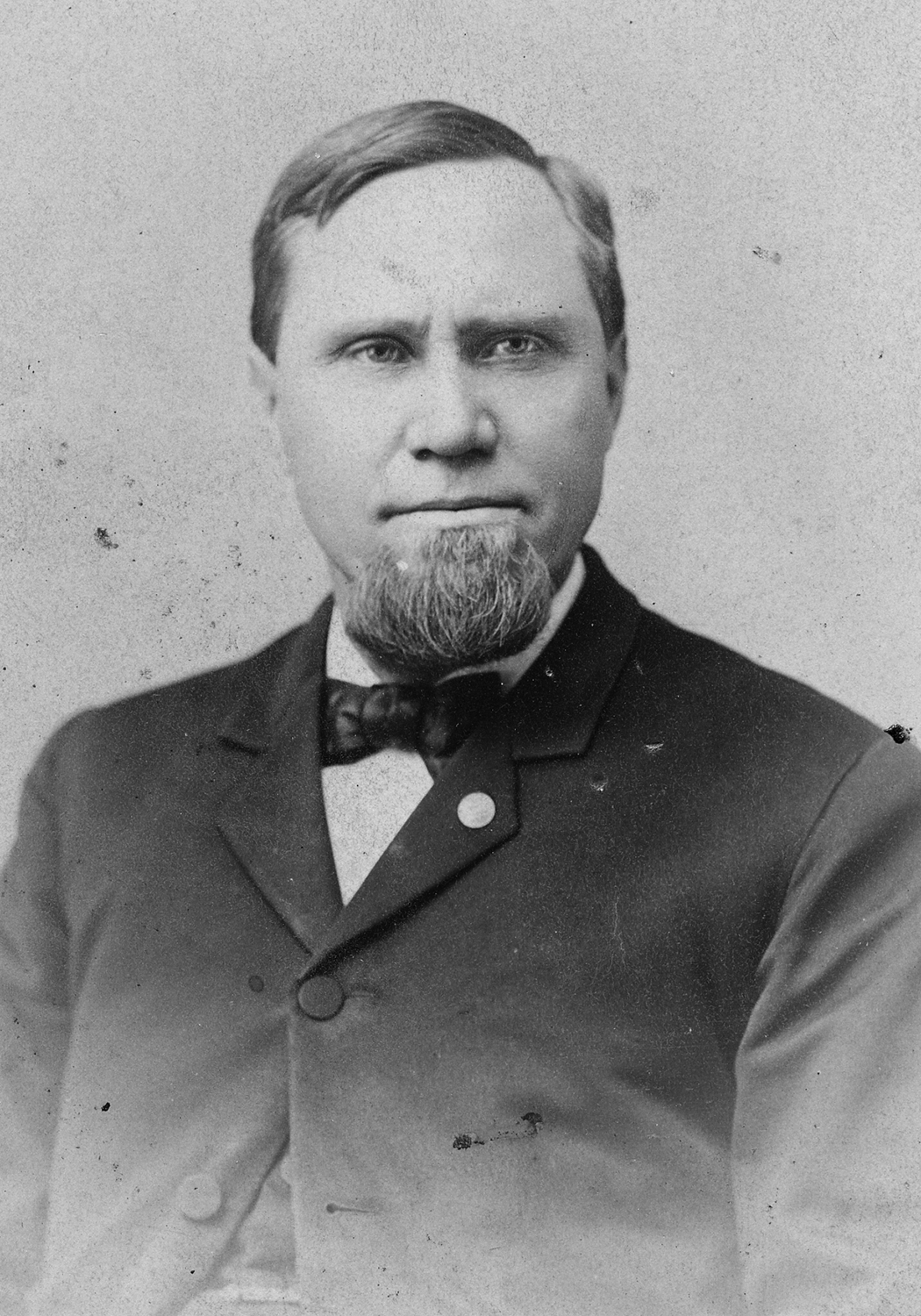

Member of the Illinois House of Representatives
- In office 1884–1888

Illinois State Senator
- In office 1888–1892

Personal details
- Born: 27 March 1837 Schuyler County, Illinois, US
- Died: 16 June 1910 (aged 73) Peoria County, Illinois, US
- Party: Republican
- Spouse: Charlotte Severns (m. 1857; div. 1865) Annie Elizabeth Gould (m. 1865)
- Children: 3
- Parents: Thomas Bassett (father); Abigail Carlock (mother)

Mark Mitchell Bassett (March 27, 1837 – June 16, 1910) was an attorney, member of the Illinois Legislature (1884-1888) and Illinois State Senator (1888-1892). After his term in the Illinois state senate, he became a probate judge in Peoria County until his death in 1910.

During the American Civil War, First Lieutenant Bassett was a member of Company E of the 53rd Illinois Infantry who was captured on July 12, 1863 at Jackson, Mississippi. He was a prisoner of the Confederacy for 487 days until his escape on November 10, 1864, and a fifty-one-day tramp through South Carolina and the mountains of North Carolina and Tennessee.

== Early life ==
Mark Mitchell Bassett was born in Schuyler County, Illinois on March 27, 1837, the youngest of four children. His father, Thomas Bassett, was born in Davies County, Kentucky and died the same year Mark was born. His mother, Abigail Carlock, was born in Overton, Tennessee.

In October 1854, his brother Nathaniel Bassett died at age twenty-one. Three years later in August 1856, his mother died at just forty-seven years old. Mark was suddenly on his own at age nineteen along with two older surviving siblings, William Bassett and Mary Jane Bassett Markley who had both married.

Besides farming the family plot of land in Fulton County, Illinois, Bassett went into business selling grain and stock in a country store in Kertin township. He also courted and married Ohio-born Charlotte Severns on December 22, 1857.

Three children were born to Bassett and his wife: Nathaniel in 1858, Sarah Jane in 1860 and Charles in 1861.

== American Civil War ==
Bassett enlisted on January 1, 1862, as a Sergeant Company G of the 53rd Illinois Infantry Regiment. For the first few months, the 53rd Illinois trained at Camp Douglas outside of Chicago, Illinois just as the camp was being turned into a prisoner-of-war camp. Then they traveled south to Mississippi supporting the Siege of Corinth and fighting small skirmishes in and out of Tennessee and Mississippi.

On October 5, 1862, they had reached the Hatchie River near Metamora, Tennessee, at Davis Bridge. The bloody Battle of Hatchie's Bridge that followed resulted in sixteen killed and forty-nine wounded from the regiment. Bassett assumed command of the company after Sergeant Armand Pallissard was killed. After the battle, he was promoted to First Lieutenant of Company E on November 10, 1862.

In 1863, the 53rd Illinois moved to Memphis, Tennessee and then in May 1863, they were moved south to take part in the Siege of Vicksburg which lasted until July 4, 1863. The day after the siege ended, they were ordered to Jackson, Mississippi.

The 53rd was one of the first regiments to arrive on July 12, 1863, and in the morning charged the heavily fortified earthworks. For the 53rd Illinois, it was a disastrous charge, going in the fight with 200 men and officers and coming out with just sixty-six. The number killed and wounded was eighty-eight with forty-six reported as missing in action.

In all, 104 prisoners were taken; forty-six were from the 53rd Illinois (who had been listed as missing in action). The 53rd's captured officers—Company E's Lieutenant Bassett, First Lieutenant George R. Lodge of Company G, and Lieutenant John D. Hatfieldof Company H.

=== Prisoner of war and escape ===
The prisoners were all moved by train and steamboat to Richmond, Virginia on an eight-day trip that covered 1300 miles. Lt. Mark Bassett and the other officers were taken to Libby Prison.

On Saturday, July 25, 1863, The Ottawa Free Trader newspaper published an article describing the battle at Jackson, Mississippi which included a list of those killed or missing in action. Under Company E, listed as “Killed,” was Lieutenant M. M. Bassett's name. His wife would not know her husband was actually alive for months.

On February 9, 1864, Bassett was one of 109 prisoners who escaped through a tunnel that had been dug in the basement of Libby Prison. He and a fellow prisoner headed east and were on the run for four days before they were recaptured on Saturday, February 13, having gotten with twelve miles of Union lines. Of the 108 escapees, fifty-nine successfully made it back to the Union lines and freedom. Two men reportedly drowned, and forty-eight including Bassett, were recaptured.

The recaptured prisoners were returned to Libby Prison and housed in the basement as punishment. In May 1864, the officers from Libby were moved to Camp Oglethorpe in Macon, Georgia. In August 1864, they were moved again to Charleston, South Carolina. Finally, in October 1864, they were moved to Camp Sorghum outside of Columbia, South Carolina.

On November 10, 1864, after bribing a Confederate guard, Lt. Mark Bassett escaped from Camp Sorghum with eight other officers, Lieutenant Thomas P. Young and Lieutenant Alfred S. Stewart, both of the 4th Kentucky; Captain James A. Wilson and Captain Alvah S. Skilton, both of the 58th Ohio; Captain Augustus Dusenberry of the 35th New Jersey; Lieutenant William Henry Harrison Welsh of the 87th Pennsylvania; Lt. Malcolm M. Moore of the 6th Michigan Cavalry; and Lt. John G. Oates of the 3rd Ohio.

For the first thirteen days after their escape, they had been helped by enslaved people in the various plantations. While moving north along the Saluda River watershed the group of nine escapees decided it was necessary to break up into smaller groups to avoid capture. Bassett continued with Lieutenants Young and Stewart. They would make their way into Transylvania County, North Carolina where they were helped by Union sympathizers who would guide them west through freezing winter weather.

Finally, three days after Christmas 1864, they arrived at an area near Murphy, North Carolina where they came together with ten other Union escapees. Along with three local guides, one of whom was only fourteen years old, the group of sixteen men made their way through a snow storm crossing over Union lines and arriving in Sweetwater, Tennessee in the early afternoon of New Year's Day 1865.

The group caught the train to Knoxville, Tennessee arriving at sunset. The former prisoners were housed at the Asylum U. S. Army General Hospital or “Soldier's Hospital” overnight.

=== The photograph ===
On January 2, 1865; a group of nine former prisoners and three of their North Carolina mountain guides, made their way to Gay Street in Knoxville. After checking in with Provost Marshal General Samuel P. Carter's headquarters, they went next door to the photography studio to Theodore M. Schleier and posed for a group photograph.

The morning after the photograph was taken, they all caught a train that headed south. Upon reaching Sweetwater, Tennessee again, the mountain guides headed back east to North Carolina. The rest of the men continued on the train to Chattanooga, Tennessee, then Nashville, Tennessee and finally north to home. Most were mustered out of service in the months afterwards and as the war ended.

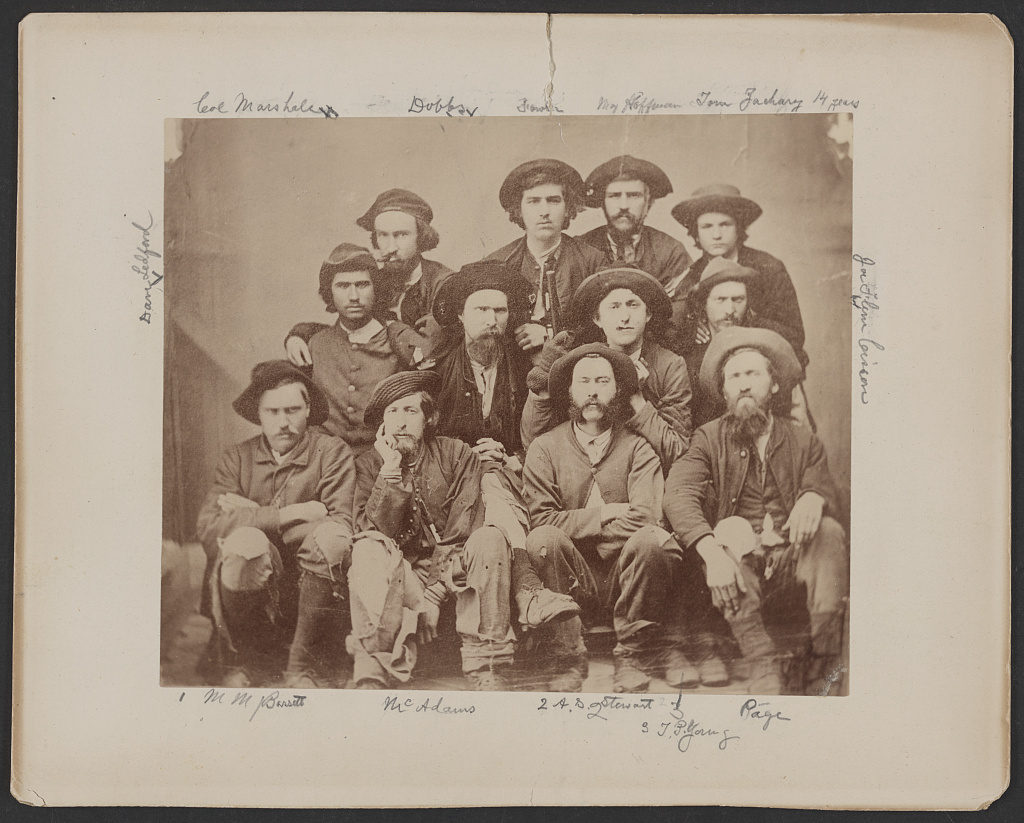
Group of Union officers who escaped from Confed. prison at Columbia, S.C.

=== Library of Congress ===
Copies of the photograph were made by Mark Bassett later in life. Several of these copies exist and are held by the Library of Congress, Chicago Historical Society and Peoria Public Library. An original albumen print is also owned by the descendants of 1st Lieutenant Michael Hoffman of the 5th Iowa Infantry. A copy made by Hoffman's family is also held by the Elk Point Historical Society, Elk Point, South Dakota.

== Post-war life ==
=== Divorce and remarriage ===
Shortly after arriving back home in Keaton Township, Illinois Mark Bassett learned that his wife Charlotte had thought he was dead for months after his capture. He filed for divorce on February 16, 1865.

Still enlisted in the army, he was ordered to report to Camp Blair in Jackson, Michigan, on March 1, 1865. He was discharged from the 53rd Illinois on April 12, 1865, he had been given a promotion to Captain but had never been mustered in before his discharge.

On April 19, 1865, Bassett's divorce was final with the custody of his three children, Nathaniel, Sarah Jane, and Charles given to him. A few months after the divorce, his four-year-old son Charles died unexpectedly.

On November 22, 1865, Bassett married Annie Elizabeth Gould in Sandstone, Michigan. Annie became a stepmother to Basset's surviving children. The couple would have one child Frank born in September 1869, but who died in the summer of 1870.

=== Career ===
In 1866, Mark Bassett and his new wife, Annie and two surviving children, relocated to Pekin, Illinois. He studied law with the help of another veteran, Alonzo W. Bull, who was a lawyer before the war. Mark Bassett was admitted to the Illinois bar in 1868 practicing in Pekin. In 1872, he moved to Peoria, Illinois and established an office there.

He focused his law practice on civil cases but also was an advocate for Civil War veterans. When the pension system was established, he would help his fellow veterans file for their pensions. In addition, he, like most of his fellow veterans, became active in the Peoria Grand Army of the Republic (GAR) post.

Bassett was elected to the Illinois legislature for two terms in 1884 and 1886. Then in 1888, he was elected to the Illinois Senate from his district in Peoria. The district was a Democratic stronghold, and Bassett, a Republican, won the race primarily with the support of veteran soldiers. He ran for reelection in 1894 but lost and returned to Peoria where he became a probate judge for the remainder of his life.

Suffering from deteriorating health, which included a stroke, Mark Bassett died in his Peoria home in the early evening of Thursday, June 16, 1910.

=== Contact with the men in the photograph ===
Mark Bassett maintained contact with several of the men in the group photograph including Alfred Stewart. Both men visited each other's homes in the 1890s. Bassett also corresponded with Thompson Roberts “T.R.” Zachary, the fourteen-year-old boy in the photograph for the remainder of his life. His wife Annie would also correspond with Zachary. He also visited Zachary and Flem Cison North Carolina in August 1895 and retraced some of the path he and his fellow prisoners had taken.
