= Russell R. Dohner =

American physician

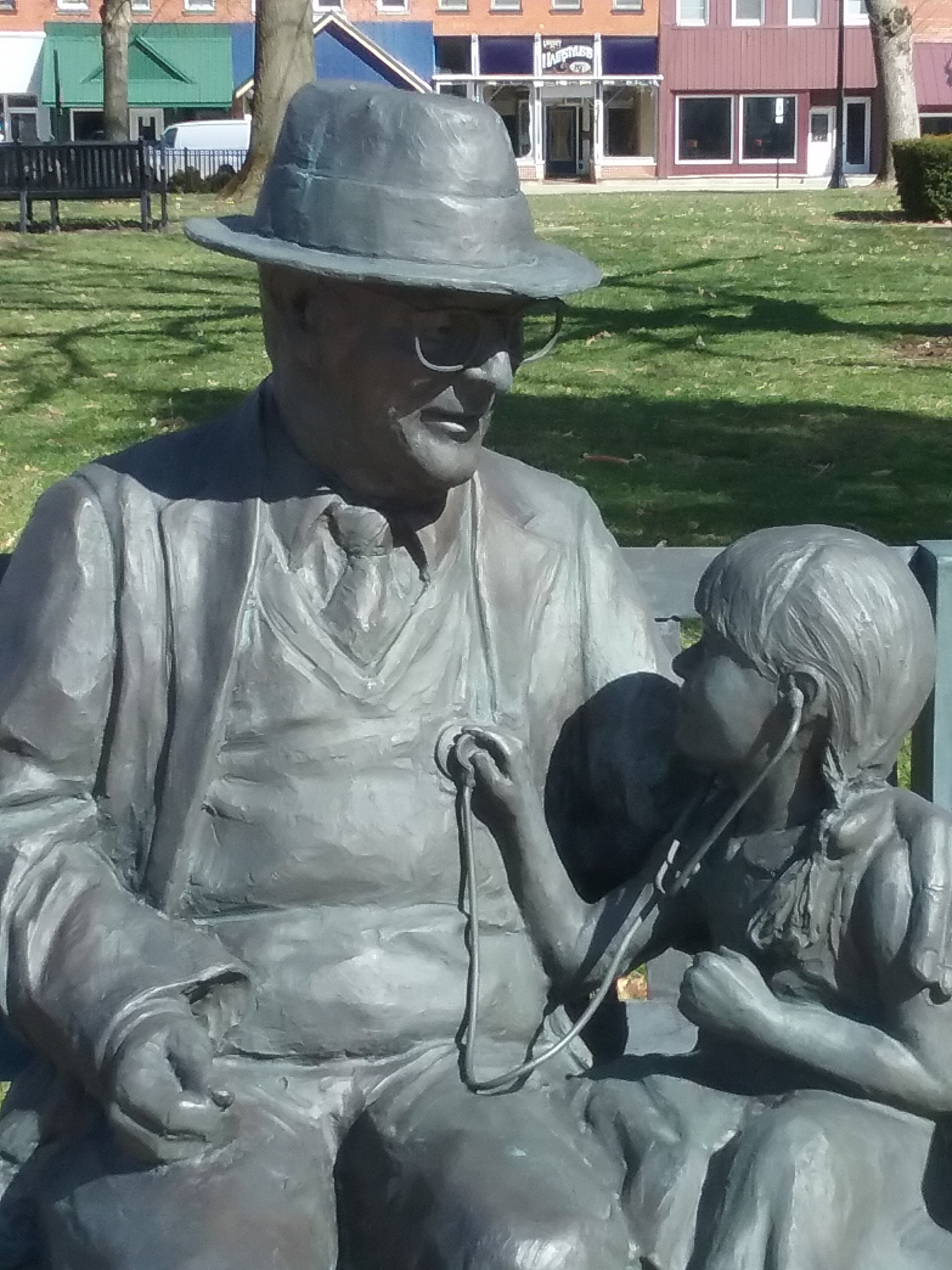
Dr. Russel R. Dohner Statue in Central Park, Rushville, IL

Russell R. Dohner, MD (February 8, 1925 – August 7, 2015) was a general surgeon and private medical practitioner affiliated with the Sarah D. Culbertson Memorial Hospital in Rushville, Illinois. His selflessness as a hometown doctor gained him national attention as he was featured in People Magazine, NBC Nightly News, the Today Show, and other publications and media.

== Life and career ==
Russell Dohner was born on February 8, 1925, at home on a farm outside of Vermont, Illinois. As a child, Dohner suffered from very high fevers which would also cause seizures. Waking up from one of these seizures in the presence of his doctor, Doctor Hamilton, inspired Dohner's journey to become a doctor himself.

After graduating from Vermont High School in 1943, Dohner was drafted in the spring of 1944. Dohner was a World War II Army Veteran. He served in a US Army Military Police unit in Washington DC. While guarding the Pentagon, Dohner was said to have met Harry Truman and General Dwight D. Eisenhower.

After his military service, Dohner attended Western Illinois University (WIU) in Macomb, Illinois, with funds from the G.I. Bill. He was one of the first four pre-med students at Western Illinois Teacher's College and became the first doctor produced by Western Illinois University. WIU recognized him as an Alumni Achievement Award recipient in 1982. He also received WIU's Distinguished Alumni Award in 1990. Lastly, in 2006, he was awarded an Honorary Doctorate of Humane Letters.

Dohner later attended Northwestern University's medical school in Chicago, IL. He graduated in 1953 and next served as a cardiologist intern at St. Luke's Hospital in Chicago, Illinois. Dohner's original plan was to practice cardiology, but his plans changed.

Dohner started providing medical services to the people of Rushville, Illinois and the surrounding communities in 1955. He didn't expect to stay but felt an obligation after the other doctor left town. In 1955, Dohner charged $2.00 for an office visit which was later raised to $5.00. He also did house calls and didn't take insurance plans. Patients would line up outside his office on the town square waiting for his office to open. Service was provided on a first-come, first-served basis and the doctor insisted on seeing everyone that came. Medical records were kept on hand written index cards. He worked seven days a week and never took a vacation. Dohner was said to have delivered over 3,500 babies. His uniform was a suit, tie, and his signature hat. Dohner retired in 2013 after 58 years of medical practice. He died at the age of 90 on August 7, 2015.

== Interests and honors ==
Dohner was civically active in the community and a member of the Rushville Rotary Club, the Masonic Lodge, and the Rushville Chamber of Commerce. The Illinois Senate signed a proclamation declaring that August 22, 2004, was Dr. Dohner Day. Dohner was the Illinois State Fair Twilight Parade Grand Marshal on August 8, 2013. Dohner appeared on NBC's Today Show several times including in 1970, 1983, 2010, and 2012. He appeared on CNN twice in 2012, once with Sanjay Gupta and once with Piers Morgan. Dohner was also featured in People magazine in 1983 and again in 2012. In 2013, Dr Dohner was the subject of US Congressional Record, Volume 159, Issue 180, titled "Tribute to Dr. Russell Dohner" by Senator Dick Durbin. Since 2013, the Doctor Russell Dohner Statue on the town square stands as a tribute for his service to the community. The community is currently working on turning his doctor's office into the Russell Dohner Museum.
