= Sugar Grove, Schuyler County, Illinois =

Sugar Grove, Illinois
- Unincorporated community
- Location within Illinois Location within the United States
- Coordinates: 40°01′46″N 90°34′18″W
- Country: United States
- State: Illinois
- County: Schuyler
- Elevation: 551 ft (168 m)
- Time zone: UTC-6 (Central (CST))
  - Summer (DST): UTC-5 (CDT)
- Area code(s): 217, 447
- GNIS feature ID: 1720736

Sugar Grove is an unincorporated community in Schuyler County, Illinois, United States. Sugar Grove is located on Illinois Route 103, 3.5 miles (5.6 km) east of Ripley.
