= World Convention of Churches of Christ =

Global convention of the three main streams of the Restoration Movement

The World Convention of Churches of Christ is a Christian world communion that links Restoration Movement churches known by a range of names including Christian churches and churches of Christ, Churches of Christ, and Christian Church (Disciples of Christ). The first Global Gathering of the World Convention was held in Washington, D.C. in 1930 at the initiative of evangelist Jesse Bader. The convention continues to organize regular international gatherings. The 19th Global Gathering was held in Damoh, India, January 12–15, 2018 and the next was scheduled for Manzini, Swaziland but postponed because of "internal tensions". Between these events, the World Convention seeks to build effective relationships among its member churches and promote Christian unity across the world.

The world convention is governed by an international board of about 20 members, currently presided by Paul Chimhungwe of Swaziland. Its offices are located in Nashville, Tennessee. Gary Holloway serves as Executive Director (General Secretary). The Executive Director travels the world preaching, teaching, and encouraging Christians on behalf of World Convention. They also represent the Stone-Campbell Movement family at a number of international ecumenical/world communion meetings.

The World Convention website has a number of features, including National Profiles of the 199 countries where Stone-Campbell Movement Churches have a presence.

== History ==
The churches who participate in the convention all grew out of the 19th Century Restoration Movement with origins in both the United Kingdom (with leaders such as William Jones and James Wallis) and the United States of America (with leaders such as Barton Stone and Alexander Campbell). Congregations participating in the Convention come from more than 195 countries and represent a range of beliefs and practices. National profiles are made available for many.

Dr. Jesse Bader initiated the first global gathering after attending a similar meeting of the Baptist World Alliance in 1925. He canvassed support from leaders in several countries including Australia, Canada, New Zealand and the United Kingdom. The World Convention of Churches of Christ was formed and in October 1930, up to 10,000 people attended the first gathering in Washington DC, U.S. The program included an afternoon tea at the White House hosted by President Herbert Hoover and the First Lady. Bader became the first president of the convention (1930–35) and was also appointed as the first general secretary, a post he held (part-time until his retirement) until his death. The endowed Bader Lecture in Contemporary Evangelism was instigated in 1970 is his honor.

The previous Global Gatherings with sitting presidents and Bader lecturers are:

- 1930 Washington D.C., U.S.; Jesse Bader, President
- 1935 Leicester, England; John Wycliffe Black, President
- 1947 Buffalo, New York, U.S.; George H. Stewart, President
- 1952 Melbourne, Australia; Reginald Enniss, President
- 1955 Toronto, Ontario, Canada; Edgar G. Burton, President
- 1960 Edinburgh, Scotland; Charles K. Green, President
- 1965 San Juan, Puerto Rico; Florentino Santana, President
- 1970 Adelaide, South Australia, Australia; Sir Philip Messent, President;Philip Potter, Bader lecturer
- 1974 Mexico City, Mexico; J. Daniel Joyce, President; George Sweazy, Bader lecturer
- 1980 Honolulu, Hawaii, U.S.; W. B. Blakemore, President (died in office, 1975), Forrest Haggard, President;
- 1984 Kingston, Jamaica; Richmond Nelson, President; Eugene A. Nida, Bader lecturer
- 1988 Auckland, New Zealand; Lyndsay Jacobs, President; Lloyd John Ogilvie, Bader lecturer
- 1992 Long Beach, California, U.S.; Harold R. Watkins, President; Fred Craddock, Bader lecturer
- 1996 Calgary, Alberta, Canada, Marj Black, President; Cyhtia Hale, Gordon Moyes and Andrzej W. Bajenski (in Polish), Bader lecturers
- 2000 Brisbane, Queensland, Australia; Ron W. Brooker, President;
- 2004 Brighton, England; David M. Thompson, President;
- 2008 Nashville, Tennessee, U.S.; C. Robert Wetzel, President; Ash Barker, Bader lecturer
- 2012 Goiânia, Goiás, Brazil; Bafundi (B.J.) Mpofu, President;
- 2017 Damoh, India; Ajai Lall, President;

== Distinctive characteristics ==
In keeping with much of the movement's focus on unity it highlights both the features it has in common with the wider Christian Church and unique gifts it has to offer the whole church.

Its mission statement says: "In Christ, all are reconciled to God and to each other, and in the Spirit, God calls us to proclaim this good news throughout the world. World Convention (Christian-Churches of Christ-Disciples of Christ) embodies and encourages fellowship, understanding, and common purpose within this global family of churches and relates them to the whole Church for the sake of unity in Christ Jesus."

Former General Secretaries of the World Convention of Churches of Christ Lyndsay and Lorriane Jacobs list these major distinctive characteristics:

1. A concern for Christian Unity
2. A commitment to Evangelism and Christian Mission
3. An emphasis on the centrality of the New Testament
4. A simple Confession of Faith
5. Believer's Baptism
6. Weekly Communion
7. A Biblical Name
8. Congregational autonomy
9. Lay Leadership
10. Diversity/Freedom/Liberty

The World Convention of Churches of Christ supports – but is administratively separate from – Global Women Connecting, a similar organization for women in churches of Stone-Campbell heritage.
