= Schuyler County, Illinois =

County in Illinois, United States

- County
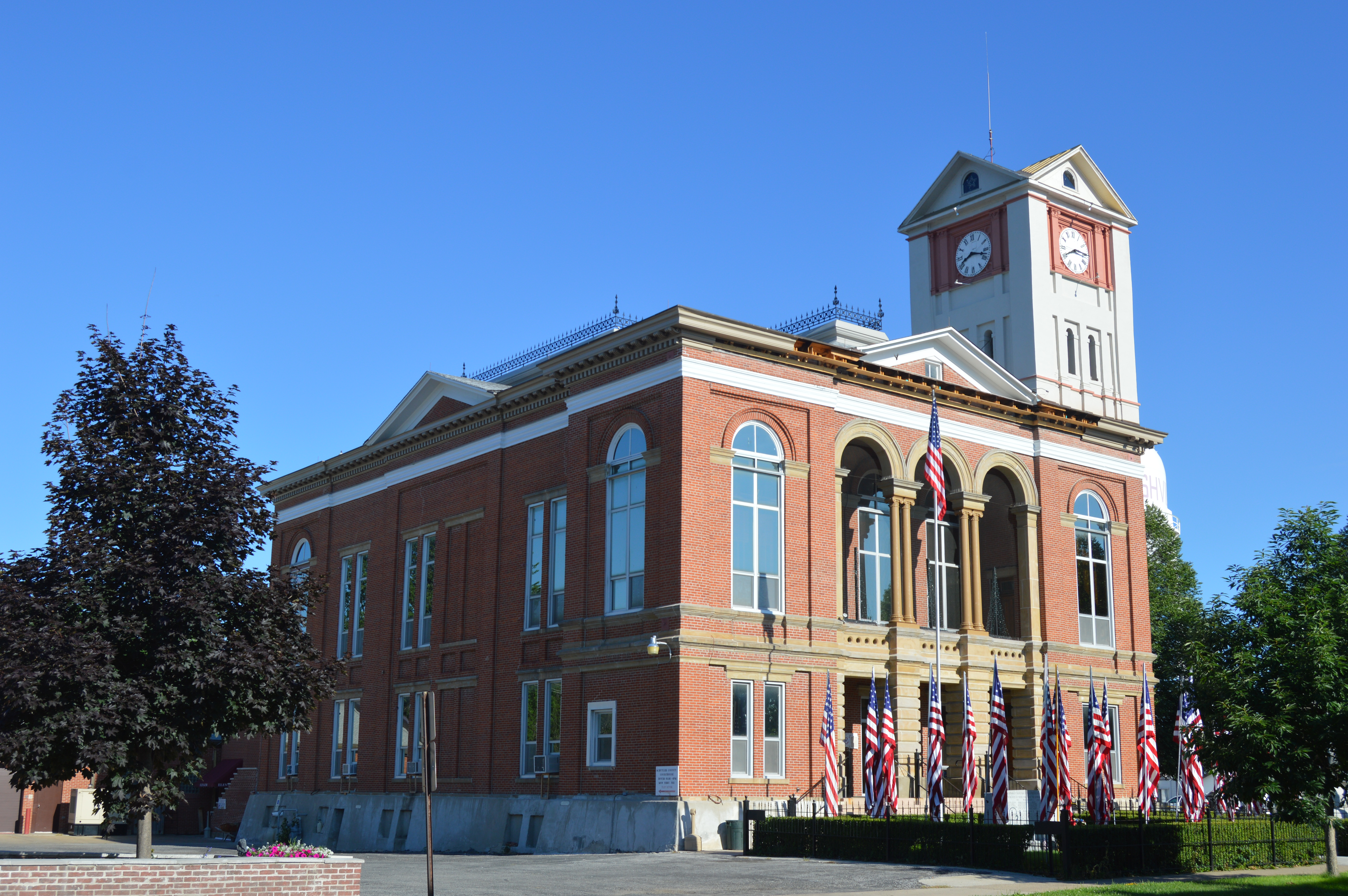
- Schuyler County Courthouse, Rushville

- Location within the U.S. state of Illinois
- Coordinates: 40°10′N 90°37′W
- Country: United States
- State: Illinois
- Founded: 1825
- Named for: Philip Schuyler
- Seat: Rushville
- Largest city: Rushville

Area
  - Total: 441 sq mi (1,140 km^{2})
  - Land: 437 sq mi (1,130 km^{2})
  - Water: 4.1 sq mi (11 km^{2}) 0.9%

Population (2020)
  - Total: 6,902
  - Estimate (2025): 6,657 ▼
  - Density: 15.8/sq mi (6.10/km^{2})
- Time zone: UTC−6 (Central)
  - Summer (DST): UTC−5 (CDT)
- Congressional district: 15th
- Website: www.schuylercounty.org

Schuyler County is a county in the U.S. state of Illinois. According to the 2020 census, it had a population of 6,902. Its county seat is Rushville.

== History ==
Schuyler County was formed in 1825 out of Pike and Fulton counties. It is named for Philip Schuyler, member of the Continental Congress and Senator from New York. In 1826, the county seat was moved from Beardstown (now in Cass County) to Rushville.

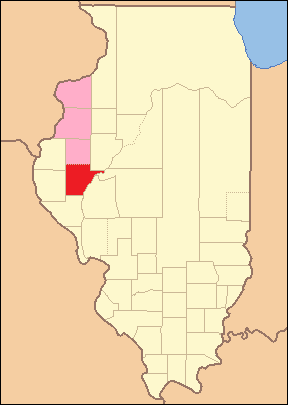
Schuyler County (1825), with unorganized territory, Warren County, and Mercer County assigned to it.

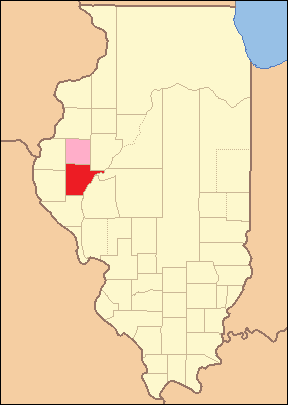
Schuyler County (1826–1830), with McDonough County assigned to it.

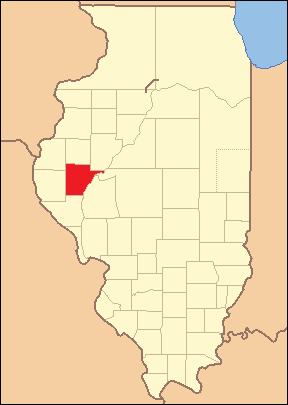
Schuyler (1830–1839), with McDonough County becoming organized.

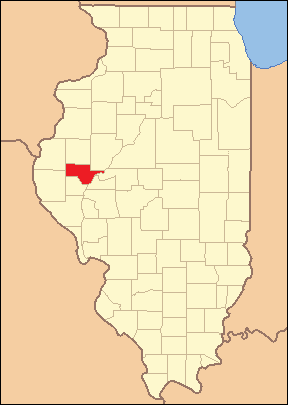
Schuyler in 1839, when the creation of Brown County reduced Schuyler to its present borders.

== Geography ==
According to the US Census Bureau, the county has a total area of 441 square miles (1,140 km^{2}), of which 437 square miles (1,130 km^{2}) is land and 4.1 square miles (11 km^{2}) (0.9%) is water.

=== Climate and weather ===
Rushville, Illinois

Climate chart (precipitation, max. and min. temperature)
J	F	M	A	M	J	J	A	S	O	N	D
1.6 32 15	1.9 38 20	3.1 50 30	3.9 63 41	5.1 73 51	3.9 82 61	3.9 87 65	3.5 84 63	3.6 78 54	3.3 66 43	3.2 50 31	2.4 37 20
- █ Average max. and min. temperatures in °F
- █ Precipitation totals in inches
- Source: The Weather Channel
Metric conversion
J	F	M	A	M	J	J	A	S	O	N	D
39 0 −9	48 3 −7	77 10 −1	99 17 5	131 23 11	100 28 16	98 31 18	90 29 17	92 26 12	83 19 6	80 10 −1	62 3 −7
- █ Average max. and min. temperatures in °C
- █ Precipitation totals in mm

In recent years, average temperatures in the county seat of Rushville have ranged from a low of 15 °F (−9 °C) in January to a high of 87 °F (31 °C) in July, although a record low of −26 °F (−32 °C) was recorded in February 1905 and a record high of 113 °F (45 °C) was recorded in July 1936. Average monthly precipitation ranged from 1.55 inches (39 mm) in January to 5.14 inches (131 mm) in May.

=== Major highways ===
- U.S. Highway 24
- U.S. Highway 67
- Illinois Route 99
- Illinois Route 100
- Illinois Route 101
- Illinois Route 103

=== Adjacent counties ===
- Hancock County (northwest)
- McDonough County (north)
- Fulton County (northeast)
- Mason County (east)
- Cass County (southeast)
- Brown County (south)
- Adams County (southwest)

== Demographics ==
Historical population
Census	Pop.	Note	%±
1840	6,972		—
1850	10,573		51.6%
1860	14,684		38.9%
1870	17,419		18.6%
1880	16,249		−6.7%
1890	16,013		−1.5%
1900	16,129		0.7%
1910	14,852		−7.9%
1920	13,285		−10.6%
1930	11,676		−12.1%
1940	11,430		−2.1%
1950	9,613		−15.9%
1960	8,746		−9.0%
1970	8,135		−7.0%
1980	8,365		2.8%
1990	7,498		−10.4%
2000	7,189		−4.1%
2010	7,544		4.9%
2020	6,902		−8.5%
2025 (est.)	6,657	▼	−3.5%
US Decennial Census; 1790-1960 1900-1990; 1990-2000 2010

=== Racial and ethnic composition ===
Schuyler County, Illinois – Racial and ethnic composition Note: the US Census treats Hispanic/Latino as an ethnic category. This table excludes Latinos from the racial categories and assigns them to a separate category. Hispanics/Latinos may be of any race.
Race / Ethnicity (NH = Non-Hispanic)	Pop 1980	Pop 1990	Pop 2000	Pop 2010	Pop 2020	% 1980	% 1990	% 2000	% 2010	% 2020
White alone (NH)	8,320	7,474	7,090	7,163	6,157	99.46%	99.68%	98.62%	94.95%	89.21%
Black or African American alone (NH)	0	2	16	240	283	0.00%	0.03%	0.22%	3.18%	4.10%
Native American or Alaska Native alone (NH)	11	9	11	12	28	0.13%	0.12%	0.15%	0.16%	0.41%
Asian alone (NH)	4	6	5	9	25	0.05%	0.08%	0.07%	0.12%	0.36%
Native Hawaiian or Pacific Islander alone (NH)	x	x	1	0	2	x	x	0.01%	0.00%	0.03%
Other race alone (NH)	3	0	1	2	17	0.04%	0.00%	0.01%	0.03%	0.25%
Mixed race or Multiracial (NH)	x	x	26	28	238	x	x	0.36%	0.37%	3.45%
Hispanic or Latino (any race)	27	7	39	90	152	0.32%	0.09%	0.54%	1.19%	2.20%
Total	8,365	7,498	7,189	7,544	6,902	100.00%	100.00%	100.00%	100.00%	100.00%

=== 2020 census ===
As of the 2020 census, the county had a population of 6,902. The median age was 47.5 years. 18.6% of residents were under the age of 18 and 23.6% of residents were 65 years of age or older. For every 100 females there were 111.2 males, and for every 100 females age 18 and over there were 115.4 males age 18 and over.

The racial makeup of the county was 90.0% White, 4.2% Black or African American, 0.4% American Indian and Alaska Native, 0.4% Asian, <0.1% Native Hawaiian and Pacific Islander, 0.7% from some other race, and 4.3% from two or more races. Hispanic or Latino residents of any race comprised 2.2% of the population.

<0.1% of residents lived in urban areas, while 100.0% lived in rural areas.

There were 2,807 households in the county, of which 25.6% had children under the age of 18 living in them. Of all households, 48.3% were married-couple households, 19.3% were households with a male householder and no spouse or partner present, and 24.6% were households with a female householder and no spouse or partner present. About 32.4% of all households were made up of individuals and 16.6% had someone living alone who was 65 years of age or older.

There were 3,320 housing units, of which 15.5% were vacant. Among occupied housing units, 79.2% were owner-occupied and 20.8% were renter-occupied. The homeowner vacancy rate was 1.9% and the rental vacancy rate was 9.3%.

=== 2010 census ===
As of the 2010 United States census, there were 7,544 people, 3,040 households, and 2,014 families residing in the county. The population density was 17.3 inhabitants per square mile (6.7/km^{2}). There were 3,459 housing units at an average density of 7.9 per square mile (3.1/km^{2}). The racial makeup of the county was 95.5% white, 3.2% black or African American, 0.2% American Indian, 0.1% Asian, 0.5% from other races, and 0.5% from two or more races. Those of Hispanic or Latino origin made up 1.2% of the population. In terms of ancestry, 26.8% were American, 20.2% were German, 13.1% were English, and 12.0% were Irish.

Of the 3,040 households, 28.2% had children under the age of 18 living with them, 53.5% were married couples living together, 7.6% had a female householder with no husband present, 33.8% were non-families, and 28.6% of all households were made up of individuals. The average household size was 2.33 and the average family size was 2.83. The median age was 43.6 years.

The median income for a household in the county was $43,686 and the median income for a family was $51,654. Males had a median income of $40,998 versus $28,810 for females. The per capita income for the county was $20,649. About 8.6% of families and 14.0% of the population were below the poverty line, including 16.8% of those under age 18 and 14.1% of those age 65 or over.

== Government and politics ==
In 1853, Schyler County adopted the township form of county government. Since November 22, 2013, Schuyler County is located in Regional Office of Education #26 alongside Hancock, Fulton, and McDonough counties.

The county is located in Illinois's 15th Congressional District and is currently represented by Republican Mary Miller. In the Illinois General Assembly, the county is split between multiple legislative districts. The northern portion of the county is located in the 47th legislative district and the 94th house district represented by Senator Neil Anderson and Representative Norine Hammond respectively. The southern portion of the county is located in the 50th legislative district and the 99th house district represented by Senator Jil Tracy and Representative Randy Frese respectively.

In presidential elections, Schuyler County usually favors Republican candidates, having voted for Democratic presidential candidates in only four elections during the period of 1944–2020. Since 1944, the Democratic candidate has won a majority of the vote in Schuyler County only once (in 1964).

United States presidential election results for Schuyler County, Illinois
Year	Republican		Democratic		Third party(ies)	
Year	No.	%	No.	%	No.	%
1892	1,563	41.20%	1,880	49.55%	351	9.25%
1896	1,848	43.37%	2,334	54.78%	79	1.85%
1900	1,791	44.22%	2,167	53.51%	92	2.27%
1904	1,636	45.28%	1,682	46.55%	295	8.16%
1908	1,622	43.31%	1,876	50.09%	247	6.60%
1912	694	20.25%	1,714	50.00%	1,020	29.75%
1916	2,595	41.57%	3,392	54.34%	255	4.09%
1920	2,800	53.86%	2,258	43.43%	141	2.71%
1924	2,729	46.21%	2,860	48.43%	317	5.37%
1928	3,011	54.00%	2,542	45.59%	23	0.41%
1932	2,075	34.99%	3,782	63.78%	73	1.23%
1936	3,029	43.54%	3,885	55.84%	43	0.62%
1940	3,318	48.77%	3,404	50.04%	81	1.19%
1944	2,801	51.82%	2,555	47.27%	49	0.91%
1948	2,519	49.65%	2,464	48.56%	91	1.79%
1952	3,295	61.30%	2,076	38.62%	4	0.07%
1956	3,068	58.22%	2,189	41.54%	13	0.25%
1960	3,047	59.00%	2,115	40.96%	2	0.04%
1964	2,417	49.12%	2,504	50.88%	0	0.00%
1968	2,760	60.00%	1,475	32.07%	365	7.93%
1972	2,994	66.03%	1,534	33.83%	6	0.13%
1976	2,635	56.44%	2,014	43.14%	20	0.43%
1980	2,799	62.76%	1,445	32.40%	216	4.84%
1984	2,515	61.93%	1,533	37.75%	13	0.32%
1988	2,178	53.57%	1,866	45.89%	22	0.54%
1992	1,512	37.85%	1,650	41.30%	833	20.85%
1996	1,597	42.60%	1,636	43.64%	516	13.76%
2000	2,077	55.06%	1,587	42.07%	108	2.86%
2004	2,403	59.61%	1,594	39.54%	34	0.84%
2008	1,833	47.75%	1,900	49.49%	106	2.76%
2012	2,069	53.02%	1,727	44.26%	106	2.72%
2016	2,524	65.83%	1,075	28.04%	235	6.13%
2020	2,773	70.78%	1,068	27.26%	77	1.97%
2024	2,720	72.21%	961	25.51%	86	2.28%

== Communities ==
=== City ===
- Rushville (seat)

=== Villages ===
- Browning
- Camden
- Littleton

=== Unincorporated communities ===
- Bader
- Bluff City
- Brooklyn
- Frederick
- Huntsville
- Sheldons Grove
- Sugar Grove

=== Townships ===
- Bainbridge
- Birmingham
- Brooklyn
- Browning
- Buena Vista
- Camden
- Frederick
- Hickory
- Huntsville
- Littleton
- Oakland
- Rushville
- Woodstock

== Notable people ==
- Mark Mitchell Bassett (1837–1910), attorney and politician

== See also ==
- National Register of Historic Places listings in Schuyler County
