= Rushville, Illinois =

- City
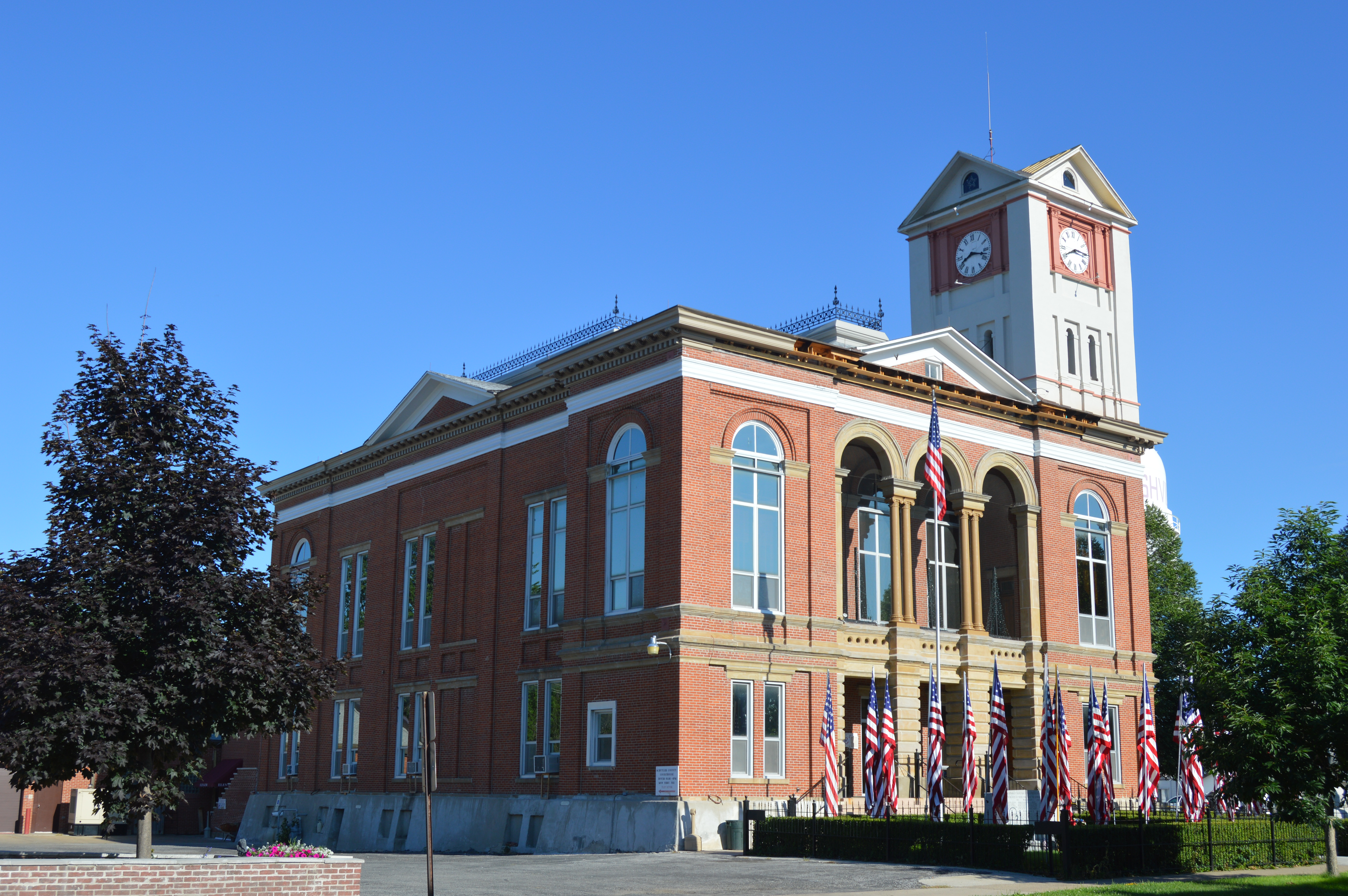
- Schuyler County Courthouse downtown
- Interactive map of Rushville, Illinois
- Location within Illinois Location within the United States
- Coordinates: 40°07′23″N 90°33′52″W
- Country: United States
- State: Illinois
- County: Schuyler

Area
  - Total: 1.65 sq mi (4.28 km^{2})
  - Land: 1.65 sq mi (4.28 km^{2})
  - Water: 0 sq mi (0.00 km^{2})
- Elevation: 669 ft (204 m)

Population (2020)
  - Total: 3,005
  - Density: 1,818.5/sq mi (702.14/km^{2})
- Time zone: UTC-6 (CST)
  - Summer (DST): UTC-5 (CDT)
- ZIP code: 62681
- Area code: 217
- FIPS code: 17-66339
- GNIS feature ID: 2396453
- Website: rushvilleillinois.us

Rushville is a town in Schuyler County, Illinois, United States. The population was 3,005 at the 2020 census. It is the county seat of Schuyler County. It was first settled by Euro-Americans in 1823.

== History ==
In 1823, Calvin Hobart and his family became the region's first settlers. Schuyler County was official established two years later, originally containing portions of what is today Pike, Fulton, and Brown counties. The county seat was named "Rushton" in honor of Benjamin Rush, one of the Founding Fathers. The name was changed to "Rushville" in 1826.

== Geography ==
According to the 2010 census, Rushville has a total area of 1.65 square miles (4.27 km^{2}), all land.

=== Climate ===
Climate data for Rushville, Illinois (1991–2020 normals, extremes 1890–present)
Month	Jan	Feb	Mar	Apr	May	Jun	Jul	Aug	Sep	Oct	Nov	Dec	Year
Record high °F (°C)	74 (23)	78 (26)	90 (32)	95 (35)	105 (41)	104 (40)	113 (45)	111 (44)	103 (39)	93 (34)	84 (29)	76 (24)	113 (45)
Mean daily maximum °F (°C)	32.9 (0.5)	38.1 (3.4)	49.8 (9.9)	62.3 (16.8)	72.2 (22.3)	81.0 (27.2)	84.5 (29.2)	83.2 (28.4)	77.0 (25.0)	64.8 (18.2)	50.3 (10.2)	38.5 (3.6)	61.2 (16.2)
Daily mean °F (°C)	25.0 (−3.9)	29.5 (−1.4)	40.3 (4.6)	51.9 (11.1)	62.3 (16.8)	71.3 (21.8)	74.9 (23.8)	73.1 (22.8)	66.2 (19.0)	54.2 (12.3)	41.4 (5.2)	30.6 (−0.8)	51.7 (10.9)
Mean daily minimum °F (°C)	17.0 (−8.3)	21.0 (−6.1)	30.7 (−0.7)	41.5 (5.3)	52.4 (11.3)	61.6 (16.4)	65.2 (18.4)	63.1 (17.3)	53.3 (11.8)	43.6 (6.4)	32.5 (0.3)	22.8 (−5.1)	42.2 (5.7)
Record low °F (°C)	−21 (−29)	−26 (−32)	−11 (−24)	9 (−13)	21 (−6)	39 (4)	42 (6)	41 (5)	26 (−3)	4 (−16)	−8 (−22)	−22 (−30)	−26 (−32)
Average precipitation inches (mm)	1.78 (45)	2.09 (53)	2.60 (66)	3.88 (99)	5.33 (135)	5.01 (127)	4.03 (102)	3.75 (95)	3.92 (100)	3.43 (87)	2.67 (68)	2.41 (61)	40.90 (1,039)
Average precipitation days (≥ 0.01 in)	6.0	6.3	7.0	9.0	9.5	8.9	6.7	6.6	6.5	7.3	6.4	6.0	86.2
Source: NOAA

== Demographics ==
Historical population
Census	Pop.	Note	%±
1850	1,251		—
1860	1,312		4.9%
1870	1,539		17.3%
1880	1,662		8.0%
1890	2,031		22.2%
1900	2,292		12.9%
1910	2,422		5.7%
1920	2,275		−6.1%
1930	2,388		5.0%
1940	2,480		3.9%
1950	2,682		8.1%
1960	2,819		5.1%
1970	3,300		17.1%
1980	3,348		1.5%
1990	3,229		−3.6%
2000	3,212		−0.5%
2010	3,192		−0.6%
2020	3,005		−5.9%
U.S. Decennial Census

=== 2020 census ===
As of the 2020 census, Rushville had a population of 3,005. The median age was 44.2 years. 21.1% of residents were under the age of 18 and 24.6% of residents were 65 years of age or older. For every 100 females there were 88.0 males, and for every 100 females age 18 and over there were 86.6 males age 18 and over.

0.0% of residents lived in urban areas, while 100.0% lived in rural areas.

There were 1,357 households in Rushville, of which 26.1% had children under the age of 18 living in them. Of all households, 39.1% were married-couple households, 19.8% were households with a male householder and no spouse or partner present, and 32.8% were households with a female householder and no spouse or partner present. About 38.5% of all households were made up of individuals and 20.5% had someone living alone who was 65 years of age or older.

There were 1,569 housing units, of which 13.5% were vacant. The homeowner vacancy rate was 3.1% and the rental vacancy rate was 9.5%.

Racial composition as of the 2020 census
Race	Number	Percent
White	2,704	90.0%
Black or African American	149	5.0%
American Indian and Alaska Native	6	0.2%
Asian	20	0.7%
Native Hawaiian and Other Pacific Islander	0	0.0%
Some other race	20	0.7%
Two or more races	106	3.5%
Hispanic or Latino (of any race)	61	2.0%

=== 2000 census ===
As of the census of 2000, there were 3,212 people, 1,397 households, and 888 families residing in the city. The population density was 2,043.7 inhabitants per square mile (789.1/km^{2}). There were 1,530 housing units at an average density of 973.5 per square mile (375.9/km^{2}). The racial makeup of the city was 99.13% White, 0.06% African American, 0.09% Native American, 0.06% Asian, 0.03% Pacific Islander, 0.22% from other races, and 0.40% from two or more races. Hispanic or Latino of any race were 0.47% of the population.

There were 1,397 households, out of which 25.8% had children under the age of 18 living with them, 50.8% were married couples living together, 10.2% had a female householder with no husband present, and 36.4% were non-families. 33.2% of all households were made up of individuals, and 18.0% had someone living alone who was 65 years of age or older. The average household size was 2.22 and the average family size was 2.78.

In the city, the population was spread out, with 21.7% under the age of 18, 7.9% from 18 to 24, 24.4% from 25 to 44, 22.2% from 45 to 64, and 23.8% who were 65 years of age or older. The median age was 42 years. For every 100 females, there were 89.2 males. For every 100 females age 18 and over, there were 82.6 males.

The median income for a household in the city was $30,450, and the median income for a family was $38,125. Males had a median income of $27,582 versus $20,631 for females. The per capita income for the city was $16,180. About 7.5% of families and 10.8% of the population were below the poverty line, including 12.2% of those under age 18 and 16.8% of those age 65 or over.

== Education ==
Rushville is home to the Schuyler-Industry Community Unit School District 5. Students attend Washington Elementary School, Webster Elementary School, Schuyler-Industry Middle School, and Rushville-Industry High School which are all located in Rushville.

Spoon River College holds for-credit classes at its learning center in Rushville.

== Point of interest ==
Murals were produced from 1934 to 1943 in the United States through the Section of Painting and Sculpture, later called the Section of Fine Arts, of the Treasury Department. In 1938 artist Rainey Bennett painted an oil on canvas mural for the post offices in Rushville titled, Hart Fellows - Builder of Rushville.

== Notable people ==
- Larry Ball, NFL linebacker for the 1972 Miami Dolphins.
- Ralph Luther Criswell, city council member (Los Angeles, California)
- William H. Dieterich, US senator
- Russell R. Dohner, Medical Doctor
- Francis M. Drake, 16th Governor of Iowa, born in Rushville
- Wesley Clair Mitchell, economist, born in Rushville
- William H. Ray, a member of the United States House of Representatives from Illinois
- Tom Rowland, college football and wrestling coach
- Edward W. Scripps, newspaper publisher and founder of The E. W. Scripps Company
- Ellen Browning Scripps, philanthropist
- James E. Scripps, publisher
- Pinkney H. Walker, Chief Justice of Illinois Supreme Court
