= Birmingham Township, Schuyler County, Illinois =

Coordinates: 40°14′36″N 90°51′24″W

Birmingham Township
- Township
- Location in Schuyler County

- Schuyler County's location in Illinois
- Country: United States
- State: Illinois
- County: Schuyler
- Established: November 8, 1853

Area
  - Total: 38.15 sq mi (98.8 km^{2})
  - Land: 38.15 sq mi (98.8 km^{2})
  - Water: 0 sq mi (0 km^{2}) 0%

Population (2010)
  - Estimate (2016): 139
  - Density: 4/sq mi (1.5/km^{2})
- Time zone: UTC-6 (CST)
  - Summer (DST): UTC-5 (CDT)
- FIPS code: 17-169-06132

Birmingham Township is located in Schuyler County, Illinois. As of the 2010 census, its population was 151 and it contained 84 housing units.

== Geography ==
According to the 2010 census, the township has a total area of 38.15 square miles (98.8 km^{2}), all land.

== Demographics ==
Historical population
Census	Pop.	Note	%±
2016 (est.)	139
U.S. Decennial Census

{{=References==
