= Clara H. Hazelrigg =

American author, educator and reformer

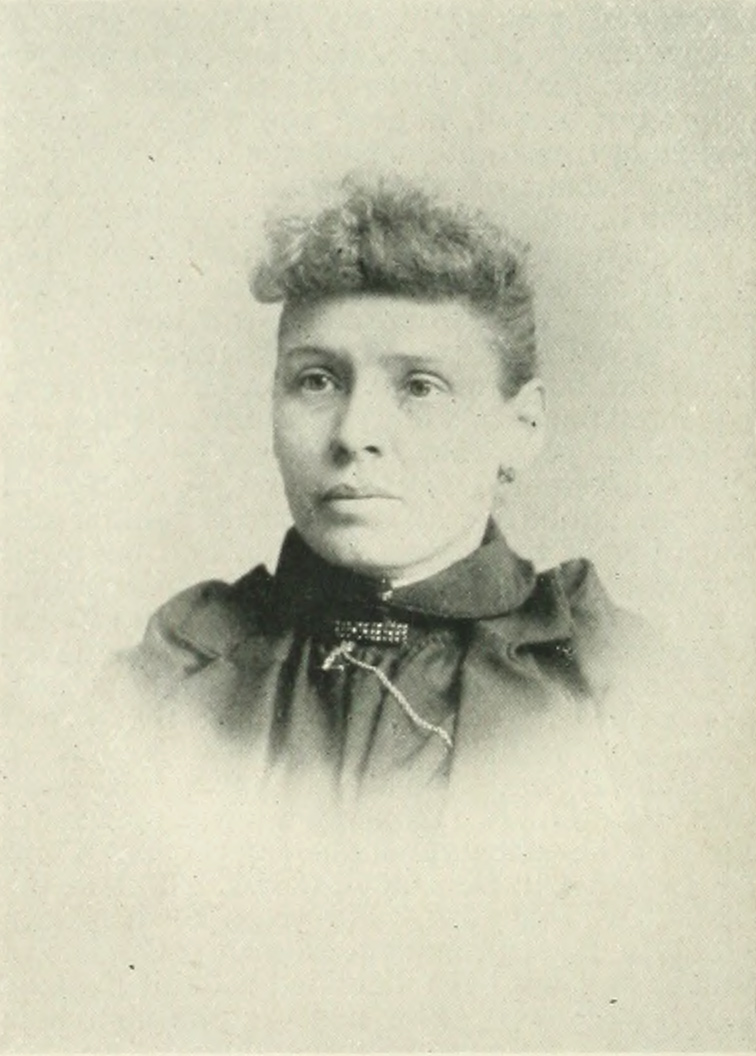
- Portrait photo in A Woman of the Century
- Born: Clara H. Espy; November 23, 1859; Council Grove, Kansas, U.S.
- Died: 1937 (aged 77–78)
- Occupations: Author, educator, reformer
- Spouse: W. A. Hazelrigg (m. 1877)
- Writing career
- Language: English

Clara H. Hazelrigg (née, Espy; pen name, C. H. H.; November 23, 1859 – 1937) was an American author, educator and reformer. She began teaching school at a young age, and after marriage and removing to Kansas, she taught school and served as principal of a ward school. She generally wrote under the initials of "C. H. H.", by which signature she was well known in the literary world. Hazelrigg died in 1937.

== Early life and family ==
Clara H. Espy was born in Council Grove, Kansas, November 23, 1859, or November 23, 1861. She was the youngest living daughter of Col. H. J. Espy. Her mother was Melora E. Cook, a teacher in the schools of Sandusky, Ohio. Her father was apprenticed to learn a trade, but ran away at the age of 13 to become a soldier. For more than 10 years, he was a member of the standing army of the United States. He served with distinction in the Mexican war and was Colonel of the 68th Indiana Volunteers during the American Civil War. He was wounded several times and his injuries caused his death shortly after the close of the war. His four children were left orphans, their mother having died in 1861.

== Career ==
From the age of 11, Clara supported herself. When 12 years old, she wrote for the press, but she shrank from public criticism and seldom wrote over her own name. At the age of 14, she began teaching in a private school. She also taught in the public schools of Ripley County, Indiana. During the American Civil War, Clara lived in Indiana. She returned, briefly, to Kansas but, upon the death of her father in 1868, she again went to Indiana, where she attended school.

On December 27, 1877, she married W. A. Hazelrigg of Greensburg, Indiana. They had one child, a girl. In 1883, or 1884, they moved to Kansas and located in Butler County, where Hazelrigg resumed her work as a teacher. She was also principal of one of the city schools in El Dorado, Kansas. Hazelrigg attended business college at Emporia, Kansas and was elected superintendent of the Butler County schools. After the family moved to Topeka, their vacations were spent at her husband's ranch in New Mexico. Hazelrigg traveled during her vacations, and wrote constantly during the entire year for the press. She wrote for prominent periodicals in various States. She was a department editor for a prominent Chicago paper, and was a regular contributor to the Topeka Lancet. In 1895, she published a History of Kansas; this was her best known literary work.

In 1897, Hazelrigg was ordained and began holding revival meetings. Hazelrigg was the pastor who converted Jesse Bader. As an evangelist, she devoted much time to act church work, and covered eight states in the West and Midwest. She was known as "the Walking Preacher." Hazelrigg spoke at the national General Missionary Convention held October 10–17, 1901 in Minneapolis, Minnesota. Hazelrigg raised the money to build a church in Topeka, the West Side Christian Church. She was its minister from 1914–1931.

She supported the Woman's Christian Temperance Union and the work of the Woman's Relief Corps. She was an active organizer for the Christian Woman's Board of Missions and served as its Kansas secretary. In 1897, she reported traveling 9,000 miles, speaking before state, Sunday School, and Christian Endeavor conventions.

== Death ==
Hazelrigg died in 1937.

== Selected works ==
- A new history of Kansas : designed expressly for use in the public schools, 1895
