= Brooklyn Township, Schuyler County, Illinois =

Coordinates: 40°13′57″N 90°44′03″W

Brooklyn Township
- Township
- Location in Schuyler County

- Schuyler County's location in Illinois
- Country: United States
- State: Illinois
- County: Schuyler
- Established: November 8, 1853

Area
  - Total: 37.12 sq mi (96.1 km^{2})
  - Land: 37.12 sq mi (96.1 km^{2})
  - Water: 0 sq mi (0 km^{2}) 0%

Population (2010)
  - Estimate (2016): 199
  - Density: 5.8/sq mi (2.2/km^{2})
- Time zone: UTC-6 (CST)
  - Summer (DST): UTC-5 (CDT)
- FIPS code: 17-169-08693

Brooklyn Township is located in Schuyler County, Illinois. As of the 2010 census, its population was 216 and it contained 107 housing units.

== Geography ==
According to the 2010 census, the township has a total area of 37.12 square miles (96.1 km^{2}), all land.

== Demographics ==
Historical population
Census	Pop.	Note	%±
2016 (est.)	199
U.S. Decennial Census
