= Frederick Township, Schuyler County, Illinois =

Coordinates: 40°04′53″N 90°26′21″W

Frederick Township
- Township
- Location in Schuyler County

- Schuyler County's location in Illinois
- Country: United States
- State: Illinois
- County: Schuyler
- Established: November 8, 1853

Area
  - Total: 15.06 sq mi (39.0 km^{2})
  - Land: 13.81 sq mi (35.8 km^{2})
  - Water: 1.25 sq mi (3.2 km^{2}) 8.30%

Population (2010)
  - Estimate (2016): 162
  - Density: 12.7/sq mi (4.9/km^{2})
- Time zone: UTC-6 (CST)
  - Summer (DST): UTC-5 (CDT)
- FIPS code: 17-169-27793

Frederick Township is located in Schuyler County, Illinois. As of the 2010 census, its population was 176 and it contained 80 housing units.

== Geography ==
According to the 2010 census, the township has a total area of 15.06 square miles (39.0 km^{2}), of which 13.81 square miles (35.8 km^{2}) (or 91.70%) is land and 1.25 square miles (3.2 km^{2}) (or 8.30%) is water.

== Demographics ==
Historical population
Census	Pop.	Note	%±
2016 (est.)	162
U.S. Decennial Census
