= Pinkney H. Walker =

American judge

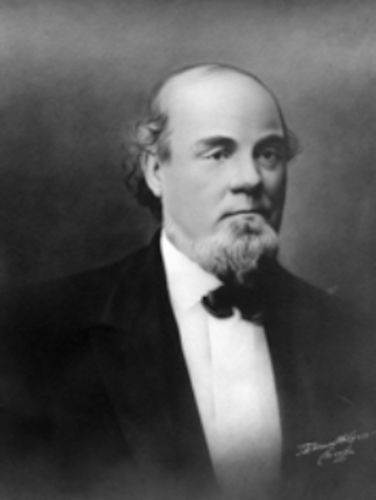
Walker's portrait at the Illinois Supreme Court.

Pinkney Houston Walker (June 18, 1815 – February 7, 1885) was an American jurist.

Born in Adair County, Kentucky, Walker moved to Rushville, Illinois where he worked in a general store as a clerk. He studied law and was admitted to the Illinois bar in 1839. Walker practiced law in Macomb, Illinois and then returned to Rushville, Illinois. In 1853, Walker served as an Illinois circuit court judge. From 1858 until his death in 1885, Walker served on the Illinois Supreme Court and was the chief justice. Walker died at his home in Rushville from a carbuncle on his neck.

His biography and a photo can be found within the Genealogy of the descendants of John Walker of Wigton, Scotland published by Emma Siggens White.
