= Huntsville Township, Schuyler County, Illinois =

Coordinates: 40°09′36″N 90°50′51″W

Huntsville Township
- Township
- Location in Schuyler County

- Schuyler County's location in Illinois
- Country: United States
- State: Illinois
- County: Schuyler
- Established: November 8, 1853

Area
  - Total: 37.93 sq mi (98.2 km^{2})
  - Land: 37.92 sq mi (98.2 km^{2})
  - Water: 0.02 sq mi (0.052 km^{2}) 0.05%

Population (2010)
  - Estimate (2016): 138
  - Density: 4/sq mi (1.5/km^{2})
- Time zone: UTC-6 (CST)
  - Summer (DST): UTC-5 (CDT)
- FIPS code: 17-169-36776

Huntsville Township is located in Schuyler County, Illinois. As of the 2010 census, its population was 150 and it contained 82 housing units.

== Geography ==
According to the 2010 census, the township has a total area of 37.93 square miles (98.2 km^{2}), of which 37.92 square miles (98.2 km^{2}) (or 99.97%) is land and 0.02 square miles (0.052 km^{2}) (or 0.05%) is water.

== Demographics ==
Historical population
Census	Pop.	Note	%±
2016 (est.)	138
U.S. Decennial Census
