= Bainbridge Township, Schuyler County, Illinois =

Coordinates: 40°03′33″N 90°31′28″W

Bainbridge Township
- Township
- Location in Schuyler County

- Schuyler County's location in Illinois
- Country: United States
- State: Illinois
- County: Schuyler
- Established: November 8, 1853

Area
  - Total: 45.09 sq mi (116.8 km^{2})
  - Land: 43.83 sq mi (113.5 km^{2})
  - Water: 1.26 sq mi (3.3 km^{2}) 2.79%

Population (2010)
  - Estimate (2016): 582
  - Density: 14.6/sq mi (5.6/km^{2})
- Time zone: UTC-6 (CST)
  - Summer (DST): UTC-5 (CDT)
- FIPS code: 17-169-03350

Bainbridge Township is located in Schuyler County, Illinois. As of the 2010 census, its population was 639 and it contained 282 housing units.

== Geography ==
According to the 2010 census, the township has a total area of 45.09 square miles (116.8 km^{2}), of which 43.83 square miles (113.5 km^{2}) (or 97.21%) is land and 1.26 square miles (3.3 km^{2}) (or 2.79%) is water.

== Demographics ==
Historical population
Census	Pop.	Note	%±
2016 (est.)	582
U.S. Decennial Census
