= Frederick, Illinois =

- Unincorporated community
- Location within Illinois Location within the United States
- Coordinates: 40°04′12″N 90°25′44″W
- Country: United States
- State: Illinois
- County: Schuyler
- Elevation: 449 ft (137 m)
- Time zone: UTC-6 (Central (CST))
  - Summer (DST): UTC-5 (CDT)
- ZIP code: 62639
- Area code: 217
- GNIS feature ID: 408710

Frederick is an unincorporated community in Schuyler County, Illinois, United States. Frederick is near the Illinois River, 4 miles (6.4 km) north of Beardstown. Frederick has a post office with ZIP code 62639.
