= Henry Smith Leiper =

- Born: 17 September 1891
- Died: 22 January 1975

Henry Smith Leiper (17 September 1891 – 22 January 1975) was a missionary. He was an ecumenist active in countries affected by Nazism.
