= Rushville Township, Schuyler County, Illinois =

Coordinates: 40°08′53″N 90°30′31″W

Rushville Township
- Township
- Location in Schuyler County

- Schuyler County's location in Illinois
- Country: United States
- State: Illinois
- County: Schuyler
- Established: November 8, 1853

Area
  - Total: 36.63 sq mi (94.9 km^{2})
  - Land: 36.4 sq mi (94 km^{2})
  - Water: 0.22 sq mi (0.57 km^{2}) 0.60%

Population (2010)
  - Estimate (2016): 2,471
  - Density: 74.8/sq mi (28.9/km^{2})
- Time zone: UTC-6 (CST)
  - Summer (DST): UTC-5 (CDT)
- FIPS code: 17-169-66352

Rushville Township is located in Schuyler County, Illinois. As of the 2020 census, its population was 2,419 and it contained 1,066 housing units.

== Geography ==
According to the 2010 census, the township has a total area of 36.63 square miles (94.9 km^{2}), of which 36.4 square miles (94 km^{2}) (or 99.37%) is land and 0.22 square miles (0.57 km^{2}) (or 0.60%) is water.

== Demographics ==
Historical population
Census	Pop.	Note	%±
2016 (est.)	2,471
U.S. Decennial Census
