= Browning, Illinois =

Browning
- Village
- Location of Browning in Schuyler County, Illinois.
- Coordinates: 40°07′35″N 90°22′28″W
- Country: United States
- State: Illinois
- County: Schuyler
- Township: Browning

Area
  - Total: 0.31 sq mi (0.80 km^{2})
  - Land: 0.31 sq mi (0.80 km^{2})
  - Water: 0 sq mi (0.00 km^{2})
- Elevation: 440 ft (130 m)

Population (2020)
  - Total: 117
  - Density: 378/sq mi (145.9/km^{2})
- Time zone: UTC-6 (CST)
  - Summer (DST): UTC-5 (CDT)
- Zip code: 62624
- Area code: 217
- FIPS code: 17-08953
- GNIS feature ID: 2397471

Browning is a village in Schuyler County, Illinois, United States. The population was 117 at the 2020 census.

== History ==
A man from Kentucky named William Robertson was the first person to build a cabin in the area near the Illinois River in the late 1820s. The town was surveyed in 1848 and named for Orville H. Browning, a lawyer and early settler from Quincy.

Browning was incorporated as a village in 1882.

Browning High School served the community from c. 1900 through 1947 before being annexed by the Rushville School District. The Grade School would remain until also closing in 1994.

== Geography ==
According to the 2010 census, Browning has a total area of 0.31 square miles (0.80 km^{2}), all land.

== Demographics ==
Historical population
Census	Pop.	Note	%±
1860	219		—
1870	214		−2.3%
1880	230		7.5%
1900	455		—
1910	551		21.1%
1920	456		−17.2%
1930	458		0.4%
1940	402		−12.2%
1950	324		−19.4%
1960	300		−7.4%
1970	276		−8.0%
1980	246		−10.9%
1990	193		−21.5%
2000	130		−32.6%
2010	137		5.4%
2020	117		−14.6%
U.S. Decennial Census

As of the census of 2000, there were 130 people, 57 households, and 38 families residing in the village. The population density was 419.0 inhabitants per square mile (161.8/km^{2}). There were 63 housing units at an average density of 203.1 per square mile (78.4/km^{2}). The racial makeup of the village was 99.23% White and 0.77% Native American. Hispanic or Latino of any race were 1.54% of the population. There were 57 households, out of which 19.3% had children under the age of 18 living with them, 57.9% were married couples living together, 7.0% had a female householder with no husband present, and 31.6% were non-families. 29.8% of all households were made up of individuals, and 21.1% had someone living alone who was 65 years of age or older. The average household size was 2.28 and the average family size was 2.79.

In the village, the population was spread out, with 16.2% under the age of 18, 10.0% from 18 to 24, 18.5% from 25 to 44, 27.7% from 45 to 64, and 27.7% who were 65 years of age or older. The median age was 47 years. For every 100 females, there were 91.2 males. For every 100 females age 18 and over, there were 87.9 males.

The median income for a household in the village was $44,107, and the median income for a family was $50,625. Males had a median income of $31,667 versus $21,667 for females. The per capita income for the village was $18,109. There were no families and 3.7% of the population living below the poverty line, including no under eighteens and 10.3% of those over 64.
