= Browning Township, Schuyler County, Illinois =

Coordinates: 40°08′42″N 90°23′52″W

Browning Township
- Township
- Location in Schuyler County

- Schuyler County's location in Illinois
- Country: United States
- State: Illinois
- County: Schuyler
- Established: November 8, 1853

Area
  - Total: 29.18 sq mi (75.6 km^{2})
  - Land: 28.79 sq mi (74.6 km^{2})
  - Water: 0.39 sq mi (1.0 km^{2}) 1.34%

Population (2010)
  - Estimate (2016): 367
  - Density: 13.9/sq mi (5.4/km^{2})
- Time zone: UTC-6 (CST)
  - Summer (DST): UTC-5 (CDT)
- FIPS code: 17-169-08966

Browning Township is located in Schuyler County, Illinois. As of the 2010 census, its population was 399 and it contained 226 housing units.

== Geography ==
According to the 2010 census, the township has a total area of 29.18 square miles (75.6 km^{2}), of which 28.79 square miles (74.6 km^{2}) (or 98.66%) is land and 0.39 square miles (1.0 km^{2}) (or 1.34%) is water.

== Demographics ==
Historical population
Census	Pop.	Note	%±
2016 (est.)	367
U.S. Decennial Census
