= 2026 United States Senate election in Illinois =

- November 3, 2026
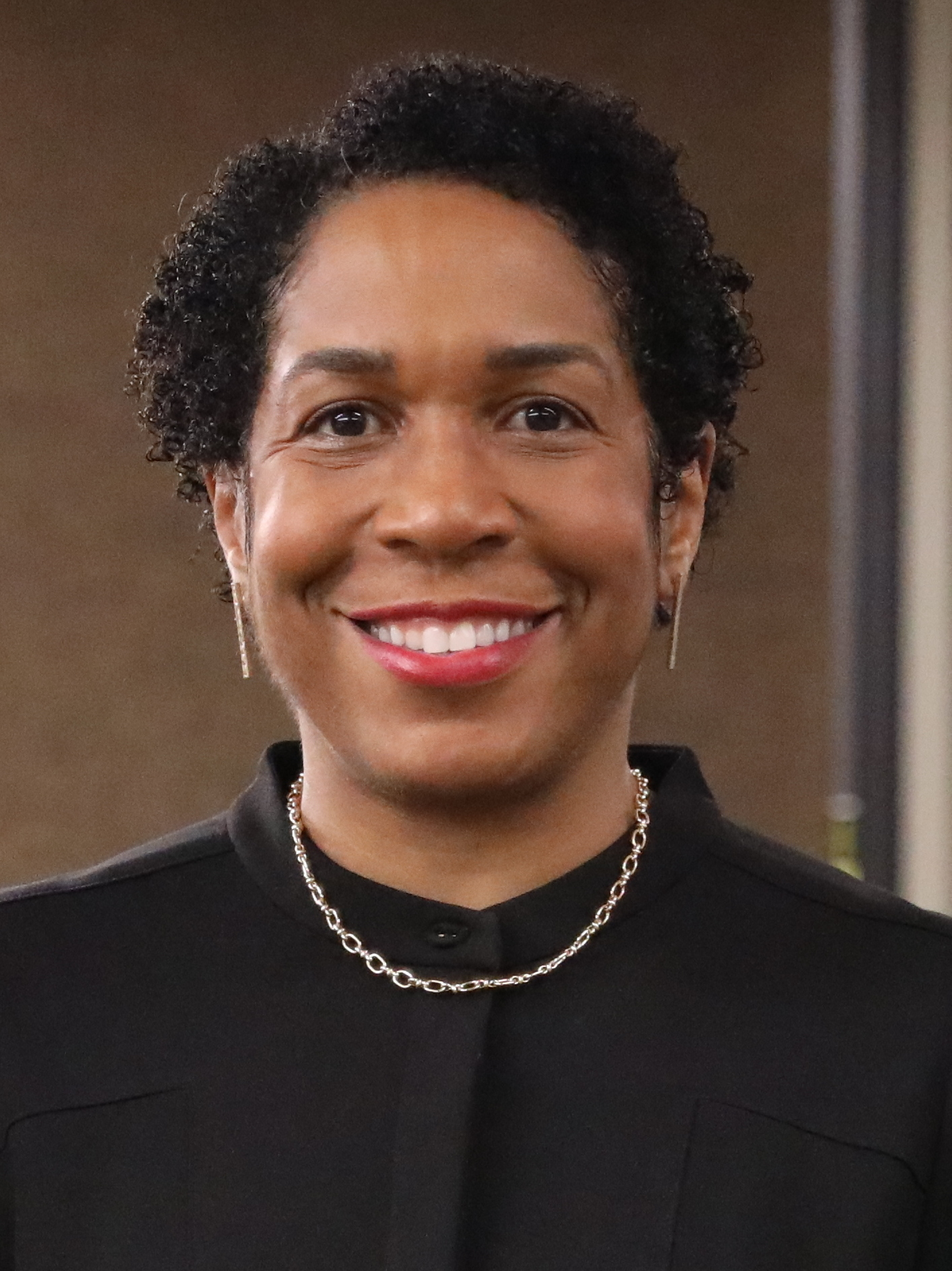

Nominee	Juliana Stratton	Don Tracy
Party	Democratic	Republican
Popular vote	2,620,386	1,534,193
Percentage	62.07%	36.34%
- Stratton: 40–50% 50–60% 60–70% 70–80% Tracy: 40–50% 50–60% 60–70% 70–80% 80–90%
U.S. senator before election
Dick Durbin
Democratic
Elected U.S. senator
Juliana Stratton
Democratic

The 2026 United States Senate election in Illinois was held on November 3, 2026, to elect a member of the United States Senate to represent the state of Illinois. Democratic lieutenant governor Juliana Stratton defeated Republican former state party chair Don Tracy. Democratic incumbent Dick Durbin did not seek a sixth term.

Primary elections were held on March 17. Supported by Governor JB Pritzker, Stratton won the Democratic nomination with 40.4% of the vote over representatives Raja Krishnamoorthi and Robin Kelly. Tracy won the Republican nomination with 40% of the vote over attorney Jeannie Evans.

With the election of Stratton, Illinois became the first state to be represented by two women of color in the United States Senate as she will serve alongside Tammy Duckworth, who is Asian American.

This is the first time since 2008 that a candidate has received over 60% of the vote in a Senate election in Illinois.

== Democratic primary ==
On April 23, 2025, incumbent Senator Dick Durbin, who has held the seat since 1997, announced he would not seek re-election. The following day, Lieutenant Governor Juliana Stratton launched her campaign with the immediate endorsement of Governor JB Pritzker.

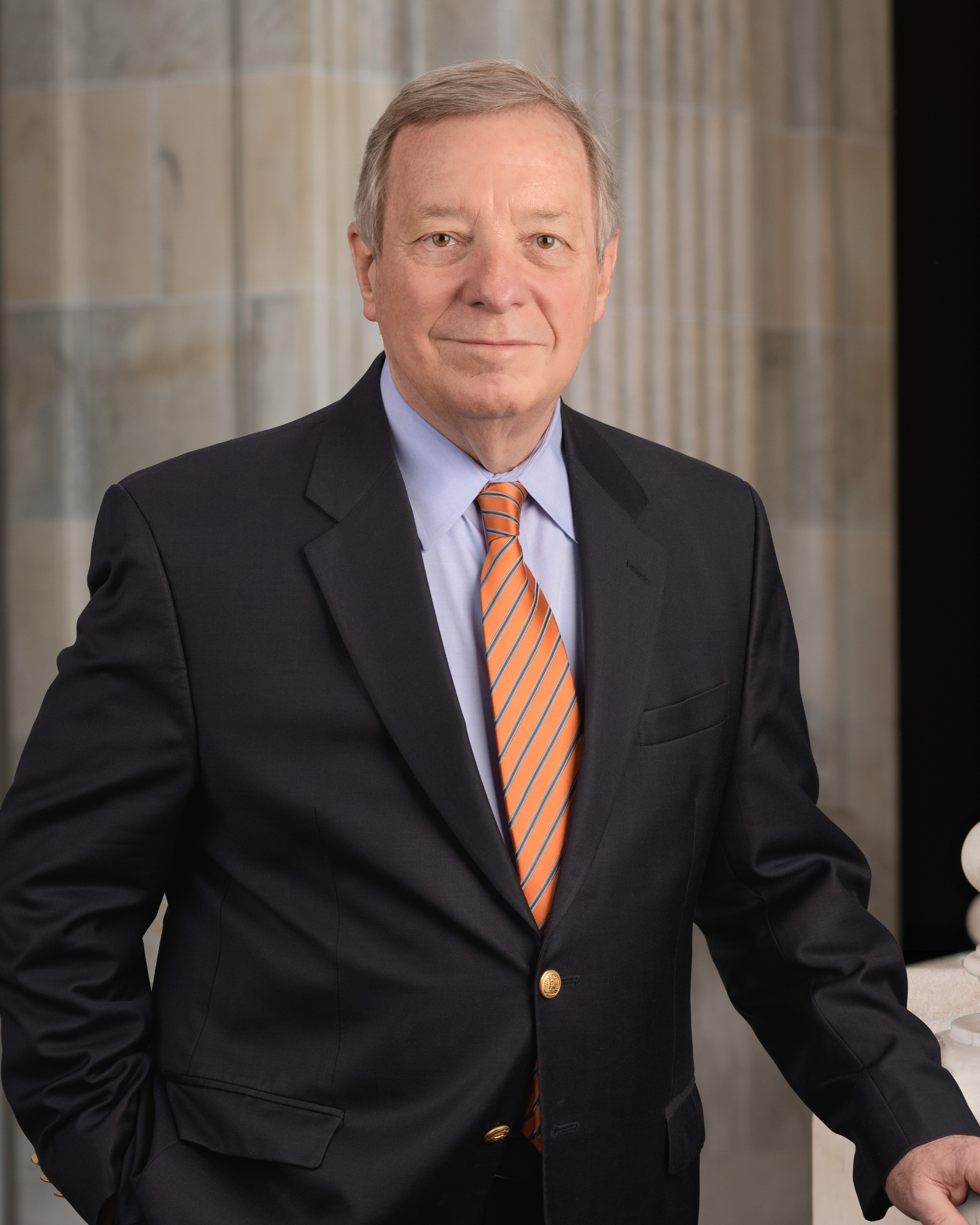
Incumbent Senator Dick Durbin

Reports soon emerged that Pritzker and his allies were attempting to discourage other prominent Democrats from entering the race, particularly U.S. Representatives Raja Krishnamoorthi, Robin Kelly, and Lauren Underwood, though Pritzker denied the claims. Kelly announced her candidacy on May 6, followed by Krishnamoorthi the next day, while Underwood declined to run and instead sought re-election to the House.

By July, Krishnamoorthi led the field in fundraising with roughly $21 million. Each of the top candidates secured significant endorsements: Stratton from suburban Democrats, state legislative leaders, and Senator Tammy Duckworth; Krishnamoorthi from local suburban officials; and Kelly from members of the Congressional Black Caucus and LGBT advocacy groups.

Krishnamoorthi emphasized his experience on the House Intelligence Committee and focused on foreign policy and economic mobility, while Stratton benefited from substantial financial backing from Pritzker and his family. Stratton pledged not to accept corporate PAC donations, although she accepted individual contributions from billionaires, whereas Krishnamoorthi and Kelly accepted corporate PAC support.

The campaign featured sharp exchanges over ties to Immigration and Customs Enforcement (ICE). By December 2025, Krishnamoorthi had raised $24 million, including donations linked to associates of President Donald Trump, Palantir, and The Heritage Foundation. Meanwhile, the Democratic Lieutenant Governors Association, which supported Stratton, received funding from CoreCivic, another ICE contractor.

The Democratic primary was widely considered a three way race between the following candidates (from left to right) Robin Kelly, Raja Krishnamoorthi, and Juliana Stratton.

On March 17, 2026, Stratton won the primary election with 40.4% of the vote, finishing ahead of Krishnamoorthi's 32.7% and Kelly's 18.3%.

=== Candidates ===
==== Nominee ====
- Juliana Stratton, lieutenant governor of Illinois (2019–present)

==== Eliminated in primary ====
- Steve Botsford, former legislative staffer and candidate for Chicago City Council in 2023
- Sean Brown, attorney
- Awisi Bustos, CEO of the Illinois Alliance of Boys & Girls Clubs and daughter-in-law of former U.S. Representative Cheri Bustos
- Jonathan Dean, solar energy entrepreneur
- Robin Kelly, U.S. representative from Illinois's 2nd congressional district (2013–present), former chair of the Illinois Democratic Party (2021–2022), and nominee for Illinois treasurer in 2010
- Raja Krishnamoorthi, U.S. representative from Illinois's 8th congressional district (2017–present) and candidate for Illinois comptroller in 2010
- Bryan Maxwell, engineer
- Kevin Ryan, former teacher
- Christopher Swann, program manager for Feeding America

==== Disqualified ====
- Adam Delgado, former ATF agent
- Anthony Williams, pastor and Republican candidate for U.S. Senate in 2022

==== Withdrawn ====
- John Goodman
- Robert Palmer

==== Declined ====
- Dick Durbin, incumbent U.S. senator (1997–present)
- Mike Frerichs, Illinois state treasurer (2015–present) (running for re-election)
- Alexi Giannoulias, Illinois secretary of state (2023–present), former Illinois state treasurer (2007–2011), and nominee for U.S. Senate in 2010 (running for re-election)
- JB Pritzker, governor of Illinois (2019–present) (running for re-election, endorsed Stratton)
- Kwame Raoul, Illinois attorney general (2019–present) (running for re-election)
- Lauren Underwood, U.S. representative from Illinois's 14th congressional district (2019–present) (running for re-election)
- Gilbert Villegas, Chicago alder from the 36th ward (2015–present) and candidate for Illinois's 3rd congressional district in 2022

=== Endorsements ===
Robin Kelly

U.S. senators

- Cory Booker, New Jersey (2013–present)
- Chris Murphy, Connecticut (2013–present)

U.S. representatives

- ~~Jonathan Jackson, IL-1 (2023–present)~~ (Note: Jackson was part of a coalition of elected officials who endorsed Kelly, but he later stated his intention to stay neutral in the primary.)
- Marie Newman, former IL-3 (2021–2023)
- Mike Quigley, IL-5 (2009–present)
- 53 other current U.S. representatives (Note: Gabe Amo, RI-01; Nanette Barragán, CA-44; Joyce Beatty, OH-03; Wesley Bell, MO-01; Don Beyer, VA-08; Brendan Boyle, PA-02; Shontel Brown, OH-11; Janelle Bynum, OR-05; André Carson, IN-07; Troy Carter, LA-02; Yvette Clarke, NY-09; Emanuel Cleaver, MO-05; Jim Clyburn, SC-06; Herb Conaway, NJ-03; Jasmine Crockett, TX-30; Debbie Dingell, MI-06; Veronica Escobar, TX-16; Adriano Espaillat, NY-13; Dwight Evans, PA-03; Valerie Foushee, NC-04; Lois Frankel, FL-22; Sylvia Garcia, TX-29; Jahana Hayes, CT-05; Steven Horsford, NV-04; Sydney Kamlager-Dove, CA-37; Marcy Kaptur, OH-09 (listed as endorsing both Kelly and Krishnamoorthi); Doris Matsui, CA-07; Lucy McBath, GA-06; Jennifer McClellan, VA-04; LaMonica McIver, NJ-10; Gregory Meeks, NY-05; Kweisi Mfume, MD-07; Gwen Moore, WI-04; Richard Neal, MA-01; Ilhan Omar, MN-05; Stacey Plaskett, VI-AL; Ayanna Pressley, MA-07; Raul Ruiz, CA-25; Linda Sánchez, CA-38; Terri Sewell, AL-07; Lateefah Simon, CA-12; Melanie Stansbury, NM-01; Emilia Sykes, OH-13; Bennie Thompson, MS-02; Mike Thompson, CA-04; Rashida Tlaib, MI-12; Jill Tokuda, HI-02; Norma Torres, CA-35; Marc Veasey, TX-33; Maxine Waters, CA-43; Bonnie Watson Coleman, NJ-12; Nikema Williams, GA-05)

Statewide officials

- Rod Blagojevich, former governor of Illinois (2003–2009)
- Pat Quinn, former governor of Illinois (2009–2015)

State legislators

- Patrick Joyce, state senator from the 40th district (2019–present)
- 4 current state representatives (Note: Will Davis, state representative from the 30th district (2003–present); Debbie Meyers-Martin, state representative from the 38th district (2019–present); Abdelnasser Rashid, state representative from the 21st district (2023–present); Bob Rita, state representative from the 28th district (2003–present))
- 3 former state representatives (Note: Linda Chapa LaVia, former state representative from the 83rd district (2003–2019); Al Riley, former state representative from the 38th district (2007–2019); Litesa Wallace, former state representative from the 67th district (2014–2019))

Local officials

- Leslie Hairston, former Chicago alder from the 5th ward (1999–2023)
- Bennett Lawson, Chicago alder from the 44th ward (2023–present)
- Lori Lightfoot, former mayor of Chicago (2019–2023)
- David Orr, former Cook County clerk (1990–2018)
- Lamont Robinson, Chicago alder from the 4th ward (2023–present)
- Byron Sigcho-Lopez, Chicago alder from the 25th ward (2019–present)
- Jeanette Taylor, Chicago alder from the 20th ward (2019–present)
- Desmon Yancy, Chicago alder from the 5th ward (2023–present)

Individuals

- Michael Pfleger, priest

Organizations

- AIPAC (co-endorsed with Krishnamoothi)
- Brady Campaign
- Collective PAC (co-endorsement with Stratton)
- Congressional Black Caucus PAC
- Elect Democratic Women
- Indivisible Kankakee
- Joint Action Committee for Political Affairs (co-endorsement with Krishnamoorthi and Stratton)

Newspapers

- The Chicago Crusader
Raja Krishnamoorthi

Executive branch officials

- Bill Daley, former White House chief of staff (2011–2012) and U.S. secretary of commerce (1997–2000)
- Zachary Fardon, former U.S. attorney for the northern district of Illinois (2013–2017)
- Gina Raimondo, former U.S. secretary of commerce (2021–2025)

U.S. representatives

- Luis Gutiérrez, former IL-04 (1993–2019)
- Phil Hare, former IL-17 (2007–2011)
- Marilyn Strickland, WA-10 (2021–present)
- 28 other U.S. representatives (Note: Ami Bera, CA-06; Ed Case, HI-01; Joaquin Castro, TX-20; Gil Cisneros, CA-31; Joe Courtney, CT-02; Jimmy Gomez, CA-34; Vicente Gonzalez, TX-34; Josh Gottheimer, NJ-05; Adam Gray, CA-13; Jim Himes, CT-04; Chrissy Houlahan, PA-06; Marcy Kaptur, OH-09 (listed as endorsing both Kelly and Krishnamoorthi); Bill Keating, MA-09; Mike Levin, CA-49; Sam Liccardo, CA-16; Seth Magaziner, RI-02; Dave Min, CA-47; Jared Moskowitz, FL-23; Kevin Mullin, CA-15; Donald Norcross, NJ-01; Jimmy Panetta, CA-19; Scott Peters, CA-50; Emily Randall, WA-06; Pat Ryan, NY-18; Greg Stanton, AZ-04; Suhas Subramanyam, VA-10; Shri Thanedar, MI-13; George T. Whitesides, CA-27)
- 2 other former U.S. representatives (Note: Carolyn Maloney, NY-12 (2013–2023) and NY-14 (1993–2013); Filemon Vela Jr., TX-34 (2013–2022))

Statewide officials

- Sheila Simon, former lieutenant governor of Illinois (2011–2015)

State legislators

- 3 current state senators (Note: Napoleon Harris, state senator from the 15th district (2013–present) and supervisor of Thornton Township (2025–present); Dave Koehler, state senator from the 46th district (2006–present); Ram Villivalam, state senator from the 8th district (2019–present))
- 1 former state senator (Note: Michael Bond, former state senator from the 31st district (2007–2011))
- 6 state representatives (Note: Sharon Chung, state representative from the 91st district (2023–present); Hoan Huynh, state representative from the 13th district (2023–present); Marty Moylan, state representative from the 55th district (2013–present); Michelle Mussman, state representative from the 56th district (2011–present); Kevin Olickal, state representative from the 16th district (2023–present); Janet Yang Rohr, state representative from the 41st district (2021–present))

Local officials

- Anthony Beale, Chicago alder from the 9th ward (1999–present)
- George Cardenas, member of the Cook County Board of Review from the 1st district (2022–present)
- Felix Cardona Jr., Chicago alder from the 31st ward (2019–present)
- Stephanie Coleman, Chicago alder from the 16th ward (2019–present)
- Dave Kaptain, mayor of Elgin (2011–present)
- Joe Moore, former Chicago alder from the 49th ward (1991–2019)
- Dick Simpson, former Chicago alder from the 44th ward (1971–1979)

Labor unions

- American Federation of Government Employees
- International Brotherhood of Electrical Workers Local 134
- International Union of Elevator Constructors Local 2
- National Association of Letter Carriers Branches 31, 88, 825, 2810, and 4016
- Teamsters Joint Council 25
- Teamsters Local 705
- United Food and Commercial Workers Local 881

Organizations

- AIPAC (co-endorsed with Kelly)
- Asian American Action Fund
- ASPIRE PAC
- Collinsville Township Democrats
- Joint Action Committee for Political Affairs (co-endorsement with Kelly and Stratton)
- National Committee to Preserve Social Security and Medicare
- Thornton Township Democrats
- Tri-Cities Democrats

Newspapers

- Daily Herald
Brian Maxwell

Organizations

- Track AIPAC (co-endorsement with Ryan)
Kevin Ryan

Labor unions

- American Federation of Government Employees Local 1126

Organizations

- Center for Freethought Equality PAC
- Independent Voters of Illinois-Independent Precinct Organization
- Indivisible Niles Maine Township
- Rally Together Indivisible Elk Grove & Schaumburg
- Track AIPAC (co-endorsement with Maxwell)
Juliana Stratton

Executive branch officials

- Carol Moseley Braun, former U.S. ambassador to New Zealand and Samoa (1999–2001) and U.S. senator from Illinois (1993–1999)

U.S. senators

- Angela Alsobrooks, Maryland (2025–present)
- Tammy Baldwin, Wisconsin (2013–present)
- Tammy Duckworth, Illinois (2017–present)
- ~~Jesse Jackson, former District of Columbia shadow senator (1991–1997) (deceased)~~ (Note: The Stratton campaign initially claimed a posthumous endorsement from Jackson, but his family later walked back the claim.)
- Elizabeth Warren, Massachusetts (2013–present)

U.S. representatives

- Danny Davis, IL-07 (1997–present)
- Chuy García, IL-04 (2019–present)
- Bobby Rush, former IL-01 (1993–2023)
- Jan Schakowsky, IL-09 (1993–present)
- Eric Sorensen, IL-17 (2023–present)

Statewide officials

- JB Pritzker, governor of Illinois (2019–present)
- Jesse White, former secretary of state of Illinois (1999–2023)

State legislators

- Greg Harris, former majority leader of the Illinois House of Representatives (2019–2023) from the 13th district (2006–2023)
- Kimberly Lightford, majority leader of the Illinois Senate (2019–present) from the 4th district (1998–present)
- Chris Welch, speaker of the Illinois House of Representatives (2021–present) from the 7th district (2013–present)
- 9 other current state senators (Note: Christopher Belt, state senator from the 37th district (2019–present); Cristina Castro, state senator from the 5th district (2023–present); Lakesia Collins, state senator from the 22nd district (2017–present); Mary Edly-Allen, state senator from the 31st district (2023–present); Laura Ellman, state senator from the 21st district (2019–present); Mattie Hunter, state senator from the 3rd district (2003–present); Adriane Johnson, state senator from the 30th district (2020–present); Julie Morrison, state senator from the 29th district (2013–present); Doris Turner, state senator from the 48th district (2021–present))
- 7 other current state representatives (Note: Murri Briel, state representative from the 39th district (2015–present); Kelly Cassidy, state representative from the 14th district (2011–present); Will Guzzardi, state representative from the 39th district (2015–present); Norma Hernandez, state representative from the 77th district (2023–present); Tracy Katz Muhl, state representative from the 57th district (2024–present); Natalie Manley, state representative from the 98th district (2013–present); Dave Vella, state representative from the 68th district (2021–present))
- 1 former state representative (Note: LaToya Greenwood, former state representative from the 114th district (2017–2019))

Local officials

- Precious Brady-Davis, Metropolitan Water Reclamation District of Greater Chicago commissioner (2023–present)
- Scott Britton, member of the Cook County Board of Commissioners from the 14th district (2018–present)
- Sam Cunningham, mayor of Waukegan (2017–2021, 2025–present)
- Jason Ervin, Chicago alder from the 28th ward (2011–present)
- Maria Hadden, Chicago alder from the 49th ward (2019–present)
- Daniel La Spata, Chicago alder from the 1st ward (2019–present)
- Gregory Mitchell, Chicago alder from the 7th ward (2015–present)
- Michael Scott Jr., Cook County commissioner from the 2nd district (2024–present)
- Debra Silverstein, Chicago alder from the 50th ward (2011–present)
- Anna Valencia, Chicago city clerk (2017–present)
- Andre Vasquez, Chicago alder from the 40th ward (2019–present)

Individuals

- Patty García, chief of staff to Chuy García and 2026 presumptive Democratic nominee in IL-04
- Mary Morten, activist
- Laura Ricketts, co-owner of the Chicago Cubs and Chicago Stars Football Club and sister of U.S. Senator Pete Ricketts
- Gloria Steinem, activist

Labor unions

- Bakery, Confectionery, Tobacco Workers and Grain Millers Local Union 1
- Cook County College Teachers Union Local 1600
- Illinois Federation of Teachers
- International Alliance of Theatrical Stage Employees Local 2
- International Association of Machinists and Aerospace Workers
- SEIU Healthcare
- SEIU Illinois State Council
- National Nurses United

Organizations

- Collective PAC (co-endorsement with Kelly)
- College Democrats of America
- College Democrats of Illinois
- Democratic Lieutenant Governors Association
- EMILY's List
- End Citizens United
- Joint Action Committee for Political Affairs (co-endorsement with Kelly and Krishnamoorthi)
- Patriotic Millionaires
- Vote Mama
Declined to endorse

U.S. senators

- Dick Durbin, Illinois (1997–present)

U.S. representatives

- Jonathan Jackson, IL-01 (2023–present)

Labor unions

- Illinois AFL-CIO
- International Union of Operating Engineers Locals 150 and 399
- Plumbers Local 130

Organizations

- Cook County Democratic Party
- Democratic Party of Evanston
- New Trier Democrats

Newspapers

- Chicago Tribune

=== Debates and forums ===
2026 Illinois Democratic Senate primary debates
No.	Date	Host	Moderators	Link	Participants		
P Participant A Absent N Non-invitee I Invitee W Withdrawn							
P Participant A Absent N Non-invitee I Invitee W Withdrawn					Kelly	Krishnamoorthi	Stratton
1	January 26, 2026	WBEZ	Tina Sfondeles; Sasha-Ann Simons; Jennifer Steinhauer		P	P	P
1	January 29, 2026	ABC7 Chicago	Judy Hsu; Craig Wall; Enrique Rodriguez		P	P	P
1	February 16, 2026	FOX 32 Chicago	Paris Schutz		P	P	P
1	February 19, 2026	WGN-TV	Tahman Bradley; Micah Materre		P	P	P

WBEZ also hosted a forum with lower-polling candidates from both parties, with Democrats Steve Botsford, Sean Brown, Jonathan Dean, Bryan Maxwell, Kevin Ryan, and Christopher Swann attending.

=== Fundraising ===
Campaign finance reports as of March 31, 2026
Candidate	Raised	Spent	Cash on hand
Steve Botsford (D)	$372,718	$372,618	$100
Jonathan Dean (D)	$124,404	$100,311	$24,092
Robin Kelly (D)	$3,466,395	$3,278,736	$187,659
Raja Krishnamoorthi (D)	$31,390,858 (Note: Includes $19,285,171 transferred from Krishnamoorthi's U.S. House campaign account.)	$28,237,935	$3,152,923
Brian Maxwell (D)	$21,976	$20,613	$1,362
Kevin Ryan (D)	$138,950	$147,814	$0
Juliana Stratton (D)	$4,791,273	$4,096,025	$695,247
Christopher Swann (D)	$4,768	$4,175	$593
Source: Federal Election Commission

=== Polling ===
Poll source	Date(s) administered	Sample size (Note: Key: A – all adults RV – registered voters LV – likely voters V – unclear)	Margin of error	Robin Kelly	Raja Krishnamoorthi	Juliana Stratton	Other	Undecided
Victory Research	March 13–15, 2026	800 (LV)	± 3.5%	14%	32%	29%	–	25%
FM3 Research (D) (Note: Poll sponsored by American Future)	March 10–12, 2026	678 (LV)	± 4.0%	18%	33%	38%	11% (Note: "Undecided/Refused" with 11%)	
Public Policy Polling (D) (Note: Poll sponsored by the Democratic Lieutenant Governors Association, which supports Stratton)	March 9–10, 2026	700 (LV)	± 3.7%	13%	30%	32%	–	25%
Tulchin Research (D) (Note: Poll sponsored by Krishnamoorthi's campaign)	March 4–8, 2026	600 (LV)	± 4.0%	12%	39%	28%	4% (Note: Kevin Ryan with 3%; Christopher Swan with 1%; Steve Botsford, Sean Brown, Awisi Bustos, Jonathan Dean, and Brian Maxwell with 0%)	15%
Change Research (D)	March 3–5, 2026	717 (LV)	± 4.0%	14%	36%	26%	8%	16%
Public Policy Polling (D)	March 2–3, 2026	577 (LV)	± 4.2%	11%	30%	33%	–	26% (Note: The press release that is the source of this poll only lists percentages for the candidates, so the positions of the remaining respondents are unknown.)
Public Policy Polling (D)	February 23–24, 2026	546 (LV)	± 4.2%	13%	29%	27%	–	31%
Public Policy Polling (D)	February 23–24, 2026	546 (LV)	± 4.2%	–	32%	37%	–	31%
Tulchin Research (D)	February 14–19, 2026	600 (LV)	± 4.0%	10%	42%	26%	6% (Note: "Someone else" with 6%)	16%
Public Policy Polling (D)	February 2–3, 2026	574 (LV)	± 4.1%	8%	34%	23%	–	37%
GBAO (D)	January 25–28, 2026	800 (LV)	± 3.5%	13%	43%	17%	–	27%
Victory Research	January 21–25, 2026	806 (LV)	± 3.5%	11%	32%	21%	6% (Note: Awisi Bustos with 2%; Jonathan Dean, Brian Maxwell, Kevin Ryan, and Christopher Swann with 1%; Sean Brown and Steve Botsford with 0%)	30%
GBAO (D)	January 8–12, 2026	900 (LV)	± 3.3%	15%	41%	16%	–	28%
Emerson College/WGN-TV	January 3–5, 2026	568 (LV)	± 4.0%	8%	31%	10%	6% (Note: Brian Maxwell, Steve Botsford, and Jonathan Dean with a combined 3%; Kevin Ryan with 2%; "Other" with 1%)	46%
Public Policy Polling (D)	December 8–9, 2025	667 (LV)	± 3.8%	9%	32%	20%	–	39%
Change Research (D)	December 4–8, 2025	1,007 (LV)	± 3.2%	7%	42%	14%	4% (Note: "Other candidates" with 4%)	33%
Victory Research	November 20–24, 2025	– (LV)	–	22%	29%	18%	3% (Note: Awisi Bustos with 2%; Sean Brown, Kevin Ryan, and Jonathan Dean with a combined 1%)	28%
Public Policy Polling (D)	September 25–26, 2025	576 (LV)	± 4.1%	8%	33%	18%	–	41%
Change Research (D)	September 17–19, 2025	1,143 (LV)	± 3.0%	8%	41%	17%	–	31%
GBAO (D)	August 12–17, 2025	800 (LV)	± 3.5%	12%	38%	18%	–	29%
Z to A Research (D) (Note: Poll sponsored by The Impact Fund PAC, which supports Krishnamoorthi)	August 8–10, 2025	615 (LV)	± 4.0%	13%	51%	28%	–	8%
GBAO (D)	June 5–10, 2025	1,200 (LV)	± 2.8%	14%	32%	19%	4%	31%

Hypothetical polling

Poll source	Date(s) administered	Sample size	Margin of error	Robin Kelly	Raja Krishnamoorthi	Juliana Stratton	Lauren Underwood	Other	Undecided
	May 19, 2025	Underwood declines to run							
Public Policy Polling (D)	April 29–30, 2025	674 (LV)	± 3.8%	8%	20%	13%	16%	–	43%
GBAO (D)	April 24–28, 2025	800 (LV)	± 3.5%	8%	21%	13%	20%	9% (Note: "Other" with 5%; Mike Frerichs with 4%)	30%
314 Action (D)	March 24–27, 2025	773 (LV)	± 3.5%	10%	30%	16%	33%	–	10%
314 Action (D)	March 24–27, 2025	773 (LV)	± 3.5%	–	32%	19%	39%	–	10%

=== Results ===
Results by county Stratton: 20–30%; 30–40%; 40–50%; 50–60%; Krishnamoorthi: 30–40%; 40–50%; 50–60%; Kelly: 30–40%; Tie: 30–40%

Results by precinct Stratton: 20–30%; 30–40%; 40–50%; 50–60%; 60–70%; 70–80%; 80–90%; >90%; Krishnamoorthi: 20–30%; 30–40%; 40–50%; 50–60%; 60–70%; 70–80%; 80–90%; >90%; Kelly: 20–30%; 30–40%; 40–50%; 50–60%; 60–70%; 70–80%; 80–90%; >90%; Ryan: 20–30%; 30–40%; 40–50%; 50–60%; 60–70%; 70–80%; >90%; Maxwell: 20–30%; 50–60%; Brown: 40–50%; >90%; Swann: 30–40%; >90%; Tie: 10–20%; 20–30%; 30–40%; 40–50%; 50%

Stratton won with 40.2% of the statewide vote; she secured 47 counties, including Cook and Will counties in the state's northeast. She recorded her best result in St. Clair County, winning 54.3% of the vote. Krishnamoorthi won 53 counties, carrying DuPage, Lake and Kane counties around Chicago. He performed best in Mercer County with 59.0% of the vote. The two leading candidates tied in Jasper County, with 32.9% of the vote each. Finally, Kelly placed third in the race; however, she did win Kankakee County with 38.2% of the vote. Kelly represents a majority of Kankakee residents as congresswoman for Illinois's 2nd congressional district.

Democratic primary results
Party	Candidate	Votes	%
Democratic	Juliana Stratton	507,689	40.4
Democratic	Raja Krishnamoorthi	411,150	32.7
Democratic	Robin Kelly	229,788	18.3
Democratic	Kevin Ryan	61,914	4.9
Democratic	Bryan Maxwell	10,070	0.8
Democratic	Sean Brown	8,122	0.6
Democratic	Awisi Bustos	8,020	0.6
Democratic	Christopher Swann	7,896	0.6
Democratic	Jonathan Dean	6,762	0.5
Democratic	Steve Botsford	5,411	0.4
Total votes		1,256,822	100.0

== Republican primary ==
=== Candidates ===
==== Nominee ====
- Don Tracy, former chair of the Illinois Republican Party (2021–2024), former member of the Illinois Gaming Board (2015–2019), candidate for lieutenant governor in 2010, and brother-in-law of state Senator Jil Tracy

==== Eliminated in primary ====
- R. Cary Capparelli, former member of the Illinois International Port District board (2000–2009) and perennial candidate
- Casey Chlebek, national director for the Polish American Congress PAC and candidate for U.S. Senate in 2020 and 2022
- Jeannie Evans, attorney
- Pamela Denise Long, occupational therapist
- Jimmy Lee Tillman, author

==== Disqualified ====
- Casandra Claiborne (Note: Removed due to sustained objection)

==== Withdrawn ====
- John Goodman, former police officer

==== Declined ====
- Mike Bost, U.S. representative from Illinois's 12th congressional district (2015–present) (running for re-election, endorsed Tracy)
- Rodney Davis, former U.S. representative from Illinois's 13th congressional district (2013–2023)
- Darin LaHood, U.S. representative from Illinois's 16th congressional district (2015–present) (running for re-election, endorsed Tracy)
- Richard Porter, former member of the Republican National Committee and the Illinois State Police Merit Board

=== Endorsements ===
Pamela Denise Long

Political parties

- Peoria County Republican Central Committee

Organizations

- Veterans for America First
Don Tracy

U.S. senators

- Mark Kirk, Illinois (2010–2017)

U.S. representatives

- Mike Bost, IL-12 (2015–present)
- Darin LaHood, IL-16 (2015–present)
- Mary Miller, IL-15 (2021–present)

Statewide officials

- Leslie Munger, former Illinois comptroller (2015–2016)

State legislators

- Chris Balkema, state senator from the 53rd district (2025–present)
- Larry Bomke, former state senator from the 50th district (1995–2013)
- Terri Bryant, state senator from the 58th district (2021–present)
- Dan Caulkins, former state representative from the 88th district (2019–2025)
- Andrew Chesney, state senator from the 45th district (2023–present)
- Michael Coffey, state representative from the 95th district (2023–present)
- John Curran, minority leader of the Illinois Senate (2023–present) from the 41st district (2017–present)
- Don DeWitte, state senator from the 33rd district (2018–present)
- Amy Elik, state representative from the 111th district (2021–present)
- Jeff Keicher, state representative from the 70th district (2018–present)
- Nicole La Ha, state representative from the 82nd district (2023–present)
- Steve McClure, state senator from the 54th district (2019–present)
- Kyle Moore, state representative from the 99th district (2025–present)
- Raymond Poe, former state representative from the 99th district (1995–2015)
- Sue Rezin, state senator from the 38th district (2010–present)
- Wayne Rosenthal, state representative from the 108th district (2011–2015, 2023–present)
- Paul Schimpf, former state senator from the 58th district (2017–2021)
- Kevin Schmidt, state representative from the 114th district (2023–present)
- Patrick Sheehan, state representative from the 37th district (2024–present)
- Dave Syverson, state senator from the 35th district (1993–present)
- Jil Tracy, state senator from the 47th district (2017–present) (candidate's sister-in-law)

Local officials

- Karen Hasara, former mayor of Springfield (1995–2003)

Newspapers

- Daily Herald
Declined to endorse

Newspapers

- Chicago Tribune

=== Debates and forums ===
2026 Illinois Republican Senate primary debates
No.	Date	Host	Moderators	Link	Participants		
P Participant A Absent N Non-invitee I Invitee W Withdrawn							
P Participant A Absent N Non-invitee I Invitee W Withdrawn					Chlebek	Evans	Tracy
1	February 11, 2026	ABC7 Chicago	Judy Hsu; Craig Wall; Enrique Rodriguez		P	P	P

WBEZ also hosted a forum with lower-polling candidates from both parties, with Republican Pamela Long attending.

=== Fundraising ===
Campaign finance reports as of March 31, 2026
Candidate	Raised	Spent	Cash on hand
R. Cary Capparelli (R)	$13,471	$12,643	$828
Casey Chlebek (R)	$202,000	$201,874	$27
Jeannie Evans (R)	$1,280,369 (Note: Includes $300,000 that was self-funded by Evans.)	$1,136,878	$143,490
Pamela Long (R)	$22,288 (Note: Includes $2,638 that was self-funded by Long.)	$21,309	$979
Don Tracy (R)	$2,327,334 (Note: Includes $2,000,000 that was self-funded by Tracy.)	$783,936	$1,543,398
Source: Federal Election Commission

=== Polling ===
Poll source	Date(s) administered	Sample size	Margin of error	Jeannie Evans	Jimmy Tillman	Don Tracy	Other	Undecided
Emerson College/WGN-TV	January 3–5, 2026	432 (LV)	± 4.7%	3%	3%	6%	–	84%

=== Results ===
Results by county Tracy: 30–40%; 40–50%; 50–60%; 60–70%; 70–80%; 80–90%; Evans: 20–30%; 30–40%; 40–50%

Republican primary results
Party	Candidate	Votes	%
Republican	Don Tracy	215,523	40.0
Republican	Jeannie Evans	122,840	22.8
Republican	Casey Chlebek	60,222	11.2
Republican	R. Cary Capparelli	56,907	10.6
Republican	Pamela Denise Long	53,810	10.0
Republican	Jimmy Lee Tillman	30,042	5.6
Total votes		539,344	100.0

== General election ==
=== Predictions ===
Source	Ranking	As of
The Cook Political Report	Solid D	November 2, 2026
Decision Desk HQ	Safe D	November 3, 2026
The Economist (Note: The Economist's prediction model uses unconventional terminology. For the purpose of equivalency, their "Very Likely" ratings are formatted as a "Likely" rating while "Likely" ratings are formatted as a "Lean" rating.)	Safe D	November 3, 2026
FiftyPlusOne	Safe D	November 3, 2026
Fox News	Solid D	November 1, 2026
Inside Elections	Solid D	October 29, 2026
MS NOW	Safe D	October 29, 2026
NBC News	Solid D	November 3, 2026
RealClearPolitics	Solid D	November 2, 2026
Sabato's Crystal Ball	Safe D	November 2, 2026
Silver Bulletin	Solid D	November 3, 2026
Split Ticket	Safe D	November 2, 2026

=== Post-primary endorsements ===
Juliana Stratton (D)

Executive branch officials

- Barack Obama, former president of the United States (2009–2017)

Labor unions

- Actors' Equity Association
- American Federation of Government Employees
- International Brotherhood of Teamsters Joint Council 25
- National Education Association
- United Mine Workers of America COMPAC

Organizations

- Black Economic Alliance PAC
- Democrats for Education Reform
- Giffords
- Jewish Democratic Council of America
- National Women's Political Caucus
- Reproductive Freedom for All

Newspapers

- The Chicago Crusader

=== Fundraising ===
Campaign finance reports as of October 14, 2026
Candidate	Raised	Spent	Cash on hand
Juliana Stratton (D)	$7,230,577	$5,688,992	$1,541,585
Don Tracy (R)	$4,914,363	$4,431,346	$483,017
Source: Federal Election Commission

=== Polling ===
Aggregate polls

Source of poll aggregation	Dates administered	Dates updated	Juliana Stratton (D)	Don Tracy (R)	Other/ Undecided (Note: Calculated by taking the difference of 100% and all other candidates combined.)	Margin
270toWin	September 30 – November 2, 2026	November 2, 2026	53.7%	41.0%	5.3%	Stratton +12.7%

Poll source	Date(s) administered	Sample size	Margin of error	Juliana Stratton (D)	Don Tracy (R)	Other	Undecided
Research Co.	October 31 – November 2, 2026	450 (LV)	± 4.6%	53%	41%	1% (Note: "Some other candidate" with 1%)	5%
ActiVote	October 21–30, 2026	400 (LV)	± 4.9%	56%	44%	—	—
ActiVote	September 26 – October 20, 2026	400 (LV)	± 4.9%	59%	42%	—	—
Public Policy Polling (D) (Note: Poll conducted for Chicago News Weekly.)	September 30 – October 1, 2026	569 (LV)	—	49%	36%	—	15%

=== Results ===
2026 United States Senate election in Illinois
Party	Candidate	Votes	%	±%
Democratic	Juliana Stratton	2,620,386	62.07	+7.14
Republican	Don Tracy	1,534,193	36.34	−2.53
American Center	Whitfield Harrington Jr.	67,369	1.60	N/A
Total votes		4,221,948	100.0	N/A
Democratic hold				

Counties that flipped from Republican to Democratic

- McHenry (largest municipality: Crystal Lake)
- Sangamon (largest municipality: Springfield)

==== By congressional district ====
Stratton won 14 congressional districts, while Tracy won three congressional districts.

District	Stratton	Tracy	Representative
1st	71.02%	26.10%	Jonathan Jackson
2nd	70.44%	26.89%	Donna Miller
3rd	75.70%	21.17%	Delia Ramirez
4th	78.02%	18.61%	Patty Garcia
5th	74.73%	22.14%	Mike Quigley
6th	60.76%	35.30%	Sean Casten
7th	87.98%	9.48%	La Shawn Ford
8th	62.77%	33.41%	Melissa Bean
9th	76.13%	20.94%	Daniel Biss
10th	67.31%	29.14%	Brad Schneider
11th	61.62%	34.34%	Bill Foster
12th	26.62%	70.44%	Mike Bost
13th	58.18%	38.24%	Nikki Budzinski
14th	58.74%	37.34%	Lauren Underwood
15th	29.24%	67.52%	Mary Miller
16th	39.50%	56.72%	Darin LaHood
17th	54.47%	41.51%	Eric Sorensen

== Notes ==
Partisan clients
