= Don Tracy =

American lawyer and politician (born 1949/50)

Chair of the Illinois Gaming Board
- In office February 2, 2015 – June 14, 2019; Acting: February 2, 2015 – June 20, 2017
- Governor: Bruce Rauner
- Preceded by: Aaron Jaffe
- Succeeded by: Charles Schmadeke

Chair of the Illinois Republican Party
- In office February 6, 2021 – July 18, 2024
- Preceded by: Tim Schneider
- Succeeded by: Kathy Salvi

Personal details
- Born: 1949 or 1950 (age 76–77) Urbana, Illinois
- Party: Republican; Democratic (formerly)
- Relations: Jil Tracy (sister-in-law)
- Education: Arizona State University, Tempe (BS); University of Memphis (JD)
- Website: Campaign website

Don Tracy (born 1949 or 1950) is an American lawyer, politician, and business owner. A member of the Republican Party, Tracy served as acting and confirmed chair of the Illinois Gaming Board (2015–2019) as an appointee of then-Governor Bruce Rauner, and as chair of the Illinois Republican Party (2021–2024), succeeding Tim Schneider. He ran unsuccessfully as a candidate for Illinois Lieutenant Governor in 2010. He was the Republican nominee in the 2026 United States Senate election in Illinois, but lost to Democratic nominee Juliana Stratton.

Tracy is a part of the family ownership group of the privately-held, major food service redistribution company Dot Foods, where he served as general outside counsel.

== Early life and education ==
Donald Tracy was born in Urbana in 1949 or 1950, and is the son of the late founder of Dot Foods Robert F. Tracy and his wife Dorothy Agnes Tracy (née Curtin). He is the eldest of 12 children. His family moved to Mount Sterling, Illinois in 1958.

He attended Western Illinois University, Arizona State University, and the University of Memphis Law School.

== Career ==
Tracy has served as a partner at the Springfield firm Brown, Hay & Stephens (since 1995), and as general outside counsel to Dot Foods, Inc. of his native Mount Sterling, Illinois.

In 2002, Tracy ran unsuccessfully for a Springfield-based seat in the Illinois Senate as a Democrat. Tracy later said he had hoped to be "more independent" within the Democratic Party than he could be among the Republicans who then dominated Sangamon County politics, called the move "naive," and said the loss taught him he was a Republican. He subsequently joined the Republican Party.

Tracy was a candidate for Lieutenant Governor of Illinois in 2010, finishing third in a field of six candidates in that primary election.

In 2015, Governor Bruce Rauner appointed Tracy to serve as Chair of the Illinois Gaming Board (IGB), the "regulatory and law enforcement agency... oversee[ing] all licensed casino gambling, video gaming[,] and sports wagering" in the State of Illinois. Tracy served in an acting capacity from February 2, 2015 until June 20, 2017, and as the Board's confirmed chair from June 21, 2017 until June 14, 2019, for a total of more than four years of service. On election of J. B. Pritzker to the governorship, Tracy offered to resign his role as Chair, but was asked by Pritzker to complete his term, which was to end on July 1, 2019. Tracy resigned his position on June 14, the day after the last of the Board's meeting scheduled within his term.

As of 2019, Tracy was continuing to serve as a partner at Brown, Hay & Stephens, and as general outside counsel to Dot Foods.

The 2026 Republican senate primary occurred on March 17, 2026. Tracy defeated attorney Jeannie Evans and national director for the Polish American Congress's PAC Casey Chlebek to win the Republican primary spot.

=== Contributions controversy ===
During the period of Tracy's extended service with the IGB at the request of incoming Governor J. B. Pritzker on May 31, 2019, Katherine Fischer, Assistant IG of the Executive Inspector General (EIG), issued a final report alleging that Tracy "engaged in a prohibited political activity... [in] making a $1,000 campaign contribution to a legislative candidate while serving as chair" of the Gaming Board. Tracy claimed that the allegation was "nonsense", arguing that the contribution had been made by his wife, thus presupposing that a wife could not make independent contributions. He also claimed that the Office of the Executive Inspector General (OEIG) had not interviewed his wife.

No further disciplinary or prosecutorial action followed, but Tracy requested a hearing before the Illinois Executive Ethics Commission (IEEC); this request was denied. Tracy then went to court, litigating the denial for two-years; a circuit court verdict found he was legally entitled to a hearing. The hearing, which took place in December 2024, involved testimony from both Tracy and his wife. The IEEC ruled in January 2025 that "the inspector general [had earlier] failed to prove by a preponderance of the evidence that Tracy had violated the law". While the press declared that Tracy had cleared his name, individuals involved in government reform expressed concern at setting a legal precedent that allowed spouses to circumvent prohibitions of illegal activity by political appointees.

== Personal life ==
Tracy is married, with 4 children and 8 grandchildren, and resides in Springfield, Illinois. Tracy's sister-in-law is state senator Jil Tracy.

Party political offices
Preceded by Tim Schneider	Chair of the Illinois Republican Party; 2021–2024	Succeeded by Kathy Salvi
Preceded by Mark Curran	Republican nominee for U.S. Senator from Illinois (Class 2); 2026	Most recent
