= Jeff Rehberger =

American gambling and cannabis entrepreneur

Jeffrey Rehberger Jr. is an American businessman based in the Chicago metropolitan area and San Juan, Puerto Rico. He is the owner of Lucky Lincoln Gaming, one of the larger operators of the Illinois Gaming Boards in Illinois, and has business interests in the cannabis industry and other sectors. Since 2017, his gaming company has been the subject of a prolonged disciplinary dispute with the Illinois Gaming Board.

== Early life ==
Rehberger is a native of Highland, Illinois. According to his LinkedIn profile, he attended Cornell University. As of 2025 he was reported to be 38 years old and based in the Chicago area and San Juan, Puerto Rico.

== Business career ==
Rehberger is the owner of Lucky Lincoln Gaming, a video gambling terminal operator in Illinois. As of 2023, the company operated roughly 1,200 terminals in about 200 bars, restaurants, gas stations and other locations across the state, including sites in the Metro East region and in central and southern Illinois. By 2025, reports placed the company at nearly 1,500 machines in about 250 locations. Company representatives have stated that Lucky Lincoln generates approximately $100 million in net terminal income annually, of which terminal operators retain about a third, with the remainder going to host establishments and to state and local governments.

Rehberger has also been described as the chief executive of Vast, a private equity firm based in Puerto Rico that serves as an umbrella company for his interests, including Lucky Lincoln Gaming, the cannabis company Cloud9 Cannabis, and ventures in real estate, solar power, cryptocurrency and other areas.

His father, Jeff Rehberger Sr., of Highland, operates video gambling lounges under the name Lacey's Place.

== Illinois Gaming Board dispute ==
Beginning in 2017, the Illinois Gaming Board (IGB) pursued an effort to revoke Lucky Lincoln Gaming's license to operate video gambling terminals. The board filed disciplinary complaints in 2017, 2019 and again in May 2023, the last of which was filed by IGB administrator Marcus Fruchter. The three complaints together contained 21 counts alleging violations of the Illinois Video Gaming Act, the Illinois Gambling Act, and the board's adopted rules on video gaming.

Many of the counts concerned alleged "inducements"—including cash payments, Rolex watches and the construction of video-gambling rooms—said to have been offered to establishment owners in exchange for installing the company's machines. Other counts related to an allegedly improper relationship between Lucky Lincoln and the company operating his father's Lacey's Place locations, as well as allegations of witness tampering and of failing to properly disclose employee information. The board stated that the company's conduct "discredits or tends to discredit the Illinois video gaming industry."

Lucky Lincoln contested the actions, including through a lawsuit filed in Cook County Circuit Court arguing that a proposed suspension would violate its due-process rights; a judge issued a temporary restraining order pausing the suspension while the case proceeded. The earlier 2017 and 2019 complaints were reported to have been held up in an administrative-review process. Company president Jeff Heimerdinger declined to comment on the pending litigation, stating that the company supports the rules of the Illinois Gaming Board.
