= Illinois Sports Wagering Act =

Betting law in Illinois, United States

The Illinois Sports Wagering Act was passed into law on June 28, 2019, with the first legal wager being placed on March 9, 2020. The Act allows for individuals 21 or older to place monetary wagers on live sporting events. In 2018, the United States Supreme Court held in Murphy v. National Collegiate Athletic Ass'n that states may authorize and license sports gambling, finding that certain provisions of the federal Professional and Amateur Sports Protection Act were unconstitutional. This ruling opened the door for states like Illinois to allow legal sports betting to their citizens. Illinois allows wagers to be placed on many sports including football, basketball, baseball, hockey, boxing, MMA, and other, less mainstream events.

After decades of illegal sports books being the primary avenue for bettors, Illinois passed the law with hopes to gain tax revenue from these black market sports books. In 2019, J.B. Pritzker explained his goals for the bill, stating "sports betting is different. This is a new market created by a recent U.S. Supreme Court decision. Every day we argue about who's in and who's out is money that goes to other states and to the black market." Illinois was able to generate $200 million in sports betting licensing fees, making it a viable stream of funding for the state.

== Early sports betting In Illinois ==
Throughout the 20th century, organized crime was the main avenue for bettors to place wagers on live sports. In Chicago, gambling houses became popular as early as the 1850s, these were typically featured in saloons around the area. Gambling houses are a house kept for the purpose of permitting persons to resort to it and allow those people to risk money or other possession on an event, chance, or contingency in the hope of the realization of gain. Organized crime was heavily involved in sports gambling syndicates in order to take on larger bets that were a bigger risk. This led to a negative stigma on gambling as a whole and the push for sports wagering to be illegal. In 1961, the Federal Wire Act was passed in order to limit wagering via wire communications there were used to send information to bettors as well as send payment. Also in 1961, Illinois made gambling in various forms, including sports wagering, formally illegal.

== Legalization process ==
After the Supreme Court ruled that the federal ban on sports gambling was unconstitutional in Murphy v. National Collegiate Athletic Ass'n, States like Illinois looked to capitalize on a lucrative industry. In 2019, Illegal sports gambling industry was valued at $150 billion. Although the Supreme Court held federal law limiting sports gambling to be unconstitutional, it did not apply to state law that marked sports gambling as criminal activity. Illinois was required to repeal their own sports gambling law that held wagering to be an illegal activity, particularly section 28 of Illinois' Criminal Code of 2012, which generally classifies gambling as criminal activity. Illinois repealed their classification of gambling as illegal activity in passing the Illinois Sports Wagering Act.

During the legalization process, there was deliberation on taxation of sports gambling revenue. Before the bill was passed into law, there were five proposed amendments deliberated on February 15, 2019. One amendment proposed taxation at 15% for brick and mortar stores and 20% for online betting, while another wanted a 50% tax on gross revenue.

== Launch ==
On June 28, 2019, Illinois Governor J.B. Pritzker formally signed the Sports Wagering Act into law. The Act allows for a 15% gross revenue tax on all licensed sports betting operations in the state. The Act also included a provision to increase the amount of diversity in the space by requiring that licensees "collaboratively work with companies that serve Illinois residents to improve their supplier diversity in a non-antagonistic manner." The Act further allows Illinois sports teams to having wagering sites in and around their stadiums. There are currently eight Illinois sportsbooks that have been given licenses as of 2021. In October of 2020 alone, over $435 million in wagers were placed on professional, college and other sporting events in the state. Taxes on those wagers are taken from the adjusted gross revenue received by the sportsbooks. In October of 2020 the total adjusted gross revenue was $42.2 million, allowing the state to collect $6.3 million from the sportsbooks. In November 2022, the total wagering handle amount broke an all-time high in Illinois with $1.03 billion.

In August 2025, the Illinois Gaming Board banned all forms of sports betting advertising during all live sports programming. Casinos and sportsbooks were also banned from promoting on any college campuses in a bid to reduce gambling harm.
