= Jil Tracy =

American politician from Illinois

Member of the Illinois Senate from the 47th district
- Incumbent
- Assumed office January 11, 2017
- Preceded by: John M. Sullivan

Member of the Illinois House of Representatives from the 94th district
- In office July 5, 2006 – January 6, 2015
- Preceded by: Art Tenhouse
- Succeeded by: Randy Frese

Personal details
- Party: Republican
- Spouse: Jim Tracy
- Relations: Don Tracy (brother-in-law)
- Education: Southern Illinois University
- Profession: Attorney
- Website: State senate website

Jil Tracy is a Republican member of the Illinois State Senate, representing the 47th District since January 11, 2017. The district covers a large swath of west-central Illinois, including all of Adams, Brown, Cass, Hancock, Henderson, Mason, McDonough, Schuyler, Warren counties and portions of Fulton and Knox counties. She was a former member of the Illinois House of Representatives, who represented the 93rd district from her appointment in July 2006 until 2015.

== Legal career ==
Tracy graduated from Southern Illinois University School of Law in 1979. Tracy practiced law in the Mount Sterling area from 1980 to 1997. While in private practice, she served as the attorney for the City of Mt. Sterling, the Mt. Sterling Fire Protection District, and the villages of Ripley and Mounds Station. Tracy was appointed by Attorney General Jim Ryan in 1997 to serve as Illinois Assistant Attorney General and Director of the West Central Regional Office. She continued in that office under Attorney General Lisa Madigan until 2004.

== Political career ==
As Illinois State Representative, Tracy's committee assignments were Consumer Protection, Local Government, Aging, Rural Economic Development, Higher Education, Juvenile Justice Reform, and Transportation & Motor Vehicles.

On September 3, 2013, Illinois gubernatorial candidate Kirk Dillard announced Tracy as his running mate.

In 2015, Tracy announced she was running for the 47th District State Senate seat being vacated by 14-year incumbent Democrat John M. Sullivan. Her House district covered the western portion of the Senate district. With Sullivan retiring, Tracy was a heavy favorite, given the 47th's strong Republican bent. She was unopposed in both the Republican primary and the general election. She was unopposed for a second term in 2018.

On December 3, 2015, she was named as an Illinois state co-chair of John Kasich's presidential campaign.

She currently serves on the following committees: Approp Ed; Executive; Higher Education; Judiciary (Minority Spokesperson); Labor; Veterans Affairs; S. C. on Crim Law & Public Safety (Minority Spokesperson); Property; EX Ethics; Elections; Sub on CLEAR Complianc .

== Personal life ==
Tracy's husband, Jim, is the Senior Vice President, General Counsel, and Secretary of the Board of Directors of Dot Foods. Dot Foods was founded in 1960 by Jim Tracy's parents, Robert and Dorothy Tracy. Dot Foods is headquartered in Mt. Sterling, Illinois and is one of the largest food distribution companies in the nation.

Tracy lives in Quincy with her husband, Jim, and their four children. Her brother-in-law is former chair of the Illinois Republican Party and nominee for U.S. Senate in 2026 Don Tracy.

== Election history ==
2006 Illinois House of Representatives District 93 General Election
Party	Candidate	Votes	%
Republican	Jil Tracy	23,646	67.11
Democratic	Gary Forby	11,678	33.05
Total votes		35,324	100.0

2008 Illinois House of Representatives District 93 General Election
Party	Candidate	Votes	%
Republican	Jil Tracy	40,376	100.0
Total votes		40,376	100.0

2010 Illinois House of Representatives District 93 General Election
Party	Candidate	Votes	%
Republican	Jil Tracy	32,630	100.0
Total votes		32,630	100.0

2012 Illinois House of Representatives District 94 General Election
Party	Candidate	Votes	%
Republican	Jil Tracy	42,378	100.0
Total votes		42,378	100.0

2016 Illinois Senate District 47 General Election
Party	Candidate	Votes	%
Republican	Jil Tracy	79,854	99.9
Independent	Kurt Fowler	112	0.1
Total votes		79,854	100.0

2018 Illinois Senate District 47 General Election
Party	Candidate	Votes	%
Republican	Jil Tracy	61,521	99.7
Independent	Write-in	160	0.3
Total votes		61,681	100.0

2022 Illinois Senate District 50 General Election
Party	Candidate	Votes	%
Republican	Jil Tracy	73,674	100.0
Independent	Write-in	1	0.0
Total votes		73,675	100.0
