= Frank Bruni =

American journalist, writer, and professor (born 1964)

- Born: Frank Anthony Bruni; October 31, 1964 (age 61); White Plains, New York, U.S.
- Education: University of North Carolina, Chapel Hill (BA); Columbia University (MS)
- Occupations: Op-ed columnist, The New York Times; former chief restaurant critic
- Notable credit: The New York Times

Frank Anthony Bruni (born October 31, 1964) is an American journalist writing for The New York Times since 1995. Following a wide range of assignments, including a stint as chief restaurant critic, he was named an op-ed columnist in June 2011. Bruni joined Duke University in June 2021 as Professor of the Practice of Journalism and Public Policy in the Sanford School of Public Policy. Since joining Duke, he continues writing a Times newsletter and remains a contributing opinion writer for the newspaper. In November 2024, Bruni received the North Carolina Award, the state's highest civilian honor, from governor Roy Cooper.

Bruni is the author of five books: The Age of Grievance, about indiscriminate pique and political dysfunction in contemporary America; The Beauty of Dusk, about his imperiled eyesight and what his medical odyssey taught him; Born Round, a memoir about his family's love of food and his own struggles with overeating; Where You Go Is Not Who You'll Be, about the college admissions mania; and Ambling Into History, about George W. Bush.

== Education ==
Bruni was educated at the Loomis Chaffee School, an independent boarding and day college preparatory school in Windsor, Connecticut, followed by the University of North Carolina at Chapel Hill, from which he graduated Phi Beta Kappa in 1986 with a B.A. in English. He was a Morehead Scholar and wrote for the student paper, The Daily Tar Heel. He then attended Columbia University's Graduate School of Journalism, from which he graduated with a master of science degree in journalism, and also won a Pulitzer Traveling Fellowship.

== Life and career ==
After graduating from Columbia, Bruni joined the staff of the New York Post and then moved on to the Detroit Free Press, where he did a wide range of beats, including a stint covering the Persian Gulf War. He spent more than a year as the movie critic and also wrote extensively about LGBT issues and AIDS. In 1992, he was a runner-up for the Pulitzer Prize in feature writing for his profile of a convicted child molester. In 1995, Bruni took a job with The New York Times as a metropolitan reporter and often wrote for the Times' Sunday magazine and for Sunday Arts & Leisure.

In 1998, he was assigned to the Washington, D.C. bureau, where he covered Capitol Hill and Congress, before being sent on the campaign trail to follow then-Texas Governor George W. Bush. He then covered the White House for the first eight months of the Bush administration and served as the Washington-based staff writer for the Sunday magazine. In July 2002, he was promoted to Rome bureau chief. Two years later, he became the Times' restaurant critic. After more than five years in that position, he returned briefly to the magazine before becoming an op-ed columnist. In the spring of 2014, he taught a journalism seminar at Princeton University. In 2016, the National Lesbian and Gay Journalists Association gave him its Randy Shilts Award for his career-long contribution to LGBT Americans. He was previously awarded the GLAAD Media Award for Outstanding Newspaper Columnist in 2012 and 2013.

Bruni's book Ambling into History chronicles his time covering Bush's campaign. Born Round deals in part with his time as the Times' restaurant critic and was named one of the best nonfiction books of 2009 by The New York Times, Publishers Weekly, The Washington Post and Amazon.com. In the Times' Sunday Book Review, Dominique Browning raved that "the love with which Bruni writes about his family is breathtaking." Publishers Weekly deemed Born Round a "powerful, honest book about desire, shame, identity and self-image."

Where You Go Is Not Who You'll Be was published by Grand Central Publishing, an imprint of the Hachette Book Group, in March 2015 and was reissued in an expanded, updated paperback a year later. In a review of it in The Washington Post, Wesleyan University President Michael Roth called it "a humane, measured book" with "lessons for a very wide audience indeed." In February 2017, Bruni released his first cookbook, written with his Times colleague Jennifer Steinhauer titled A Meatloaf in Every Oven. It includes recipes from such prominent chefs as Bobby Flay and April Bloomfield.

Bruni has also done extensive reporting on religion and is the author, with Elinor Burkett, of A Gospel of Shame: Children, Sexual Abuse and the Catholic Church. His freelance work has appeared in several magazines, including Conde Nast Traveler. Although he formalized a relationship with CNN in September 2017 and appears on its shows as a commentator about four times a week, he also appears occasionally on Real Time with Bill Maher, and has been a guest on late-night talk shows as well. He once served as a guest judge on Top Chef and appeared briefly in the movie Julie & Julia, which was written and directed by his friend Nora Ephron.

His memoir, The Beauty of Dusk, published by Simon & Schuster, reflects on the experience and discusses aging and physical limitations among Baby Boomers who once thought themselves invincible.

Bruni's last regularly scheduled opinion column for The New York Times appeared on June 17, 2021. and he was awarded the Thomas Wolfe Prize. In November 2024, Bruni received the North Carolina Award, the state's highest civilian honor, from governor Roy Cooper.

== Personal life ==
Bruni is openly gay. He has struggled with eating disorders, including bulimia. Bruni relocated from New York City's Upper West Side neighborhood to North Carolina in 2021, after becoming faculty at Duke University.

== Bibliography ==
Title	Year
The Age of Grievance. Avid Reader Press / Simon and Schuster. 2024. ISBN 978-1-6680-1643-5.	2024
The Beauty of Dusk: On Vision Lost and Found	2022
A Meatloaf in Every Oven: Two Chatty Cooks, One Iconic Dish and Dozens of Recipes, with Jennifer Steinhauer	2017
Where You Go Is Not Who You'll Be: An Antidote to the College Admissions Mania	2015
Born Round: The Secret History of a Full-Time Eater	2009
Ambling Into History: The Unlikely Odyssey of George W. Bush (1st ed.). New York: HarperCollins. 2002. ISBN 978-0-06-621371-2.	2002
A Gospel of Shame: Children, Sexual Abuse and the Catholic Church, with Elinor Burkett	1993

== See also ==
- LGBT culture in New York City
- List of LGBT people from New York City
- New Yorkers in journalism
- NYC Pride March
