= Kathy Salvi =

American politician

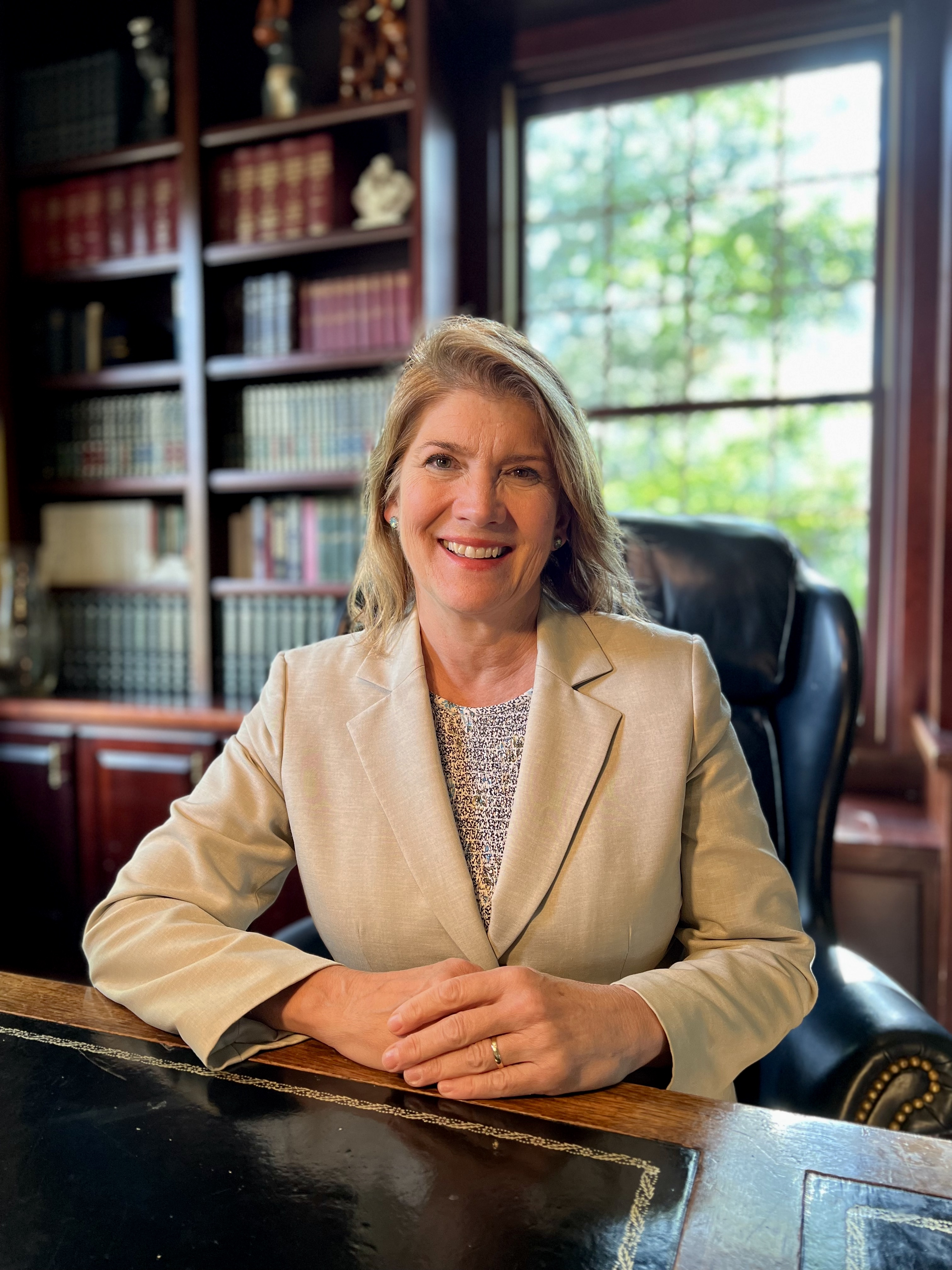
- Salvi in 2022

Chair of the Illinois Republican Party
- In office July 29, 2024 – May 18, 2026
- Preceded by: Don Tracy
- Succeeded by: Bob Grogan

Personal details
- Born: Kathleen Keller; April 23, 1959 (age 67) Waukegan, Illinois, U.S.
- Party: Republican
- Spouse: Al Salvi (m. 1988)
- Children: 6
- Education: Loyola University Chicago (BA); Illinois Institute of Technology (JD)

Kathleen R. "Kathy" Salvi (born Kathleen Keller on April 23, 1959) is an American attorney and politician who served as the Chair of the Illinois Republican Party from 2024 to 2026. Salvi was also the Republican nominee for the United States Senate in the 2022 election in Illinois.

== Early life and education ==
Salvi was raised in a family of nine in Waukegan, Illinois.

She received her Bachelor of Arts in communications from Loyola University Chicago in 1981 and her J.D. from Chicago-Kent College of Law in 1984. The same year, she was admitted to the Illinois State Bar Association.

== Political career ==
=== 2022 U.S. Senate campaign ===
In March 2022, Salvi announced that she would challenge incumbent Democratic U.S. Senator Tammy Duckworth for her seat in the 2022 United States Senate election in Illinois. She won the Republican primary with 30.2% of the vote but was defeated by Duckworth in the general election.

=== Illinois Republican Party Chair ===
In July 2024, Salvi was elected Chair of the Illinois Republican Party, succeeding Don Tracy. Her focus as party chair has been addressing issues such as crime, corruption, and cost of living in Illinois, as well as uniting a divided Republican Party. She lost her bid for a second term as chairwoman to DuPage County auditor Bob Grogan in May 2026.

== Electoral history ==
Results by county List: Salvi–20–30% Salvi–30–40% Salvi–40–50% Salvi–50–60%; Hubbard–20–30% Hubbard–30–40% Hubbard–40–50% Hubbard–50–60%; Dubiel–20–30%

Results by county Map legend: Duckworth: 40–50% 50–60% 60–70% 70–80% 80–90% >90% Salvi: 40–50% 50–60% 60–70% 70–80% 80–90% >90% Tie: 40–50% 50%

Illinois Republican primary for U.S. Senate, 2022
Party	Candidate	Votes	%
Republican	Kathy Salvi	213,057	30.2
Republican	Peggy Hubbard	175,052	24.8
Republican	Matthew Dubiel	89,561	12.7
Republican	Casey Chlebek	75,233	10.7
Republican	Bobby Piton	64,807	9.2
Republican	Anthony Williams	52,319	7.4
Republican	Jimmy Lee Tillman	35,950	5.1
Total votes		706,353	100.0

Illinois U.S. Senator (Class III) General Election, 2022
Party	Candidate	Votes	%
Democratic	Tammy Duckworth (incumbent)	2,329,136	56.82
Republican	Kathy Salvi	1,701,055	41.50
Libertarian	Bill Redpath	68,671	1.68
Write-in votes	Lowell Martin Seida	23	0.00
Write-in votes	Connor Vlakancic	11	0.00
Total votes		4,098,896	100.0

Party political offices
Preceded by Mark Kirk	Republican nominee for U.S. Senator from Illinois (Class 3); 2022	Most recent
Preceded by Don Tracy	Chair of the Illinois Republican Party; 2024–2026	Succeeded by Bob Grogan
