= 2026 Illinois State Treasurer election =

- November 3, 2026
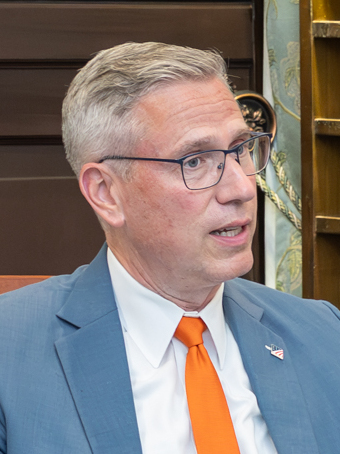

Candidate	Mike Frerichs	Max Solomon
Party	Democratic	Republican
Popular vote	2,598,244	1,540,309
Percentage	62.8%	37.2%
Treasurer before election
Mike Frerichs
Democratic
Elected Treasurer
Mike Frerichs
Democratic

The 2026 Illinois State Treasurer election was held on November 3, 2026, to elect the Illinois Treasurer, concurrently with elections to the United States Senate, U.S. House of Representatives, governor, and other state and local elections.

Incumbent Democratic treasurer Mike Frerichs originally considered running for Senate, but instead decided to run for re-election to a fourth term in office. Frerichs was initially running unopposed, as no Republican candidates had filed nor declared their intention to run for treasurer, which would have made this race the first time in over 90 years that a major party did not have any candidates file for a statewide office in Illinois.

== Democratic primary ==
=== Candidates ===
==== Nominee ====
- Mike Frerichs, incumbent treasurer (2015–present)

=== Endorsements ===
Mike Frerichs

Labor unions

- Chicago Fraternal Order of Police
- Illinois AFL-CIO
- Illinois Fraternal Order of Police
- International Union of Operating Engineers Locals 150 and 399
- SEIU Healthcare
- SEIU Illinois State Council

Organizations

- Citizen Action Illinois
- Cook County Democratic Party
- New Trier Democrats

=== Results ===
Democratic primary results
Party	Candidate	Votes	%
Democratic	Mike Frerichs	1,119,356	100.0
Total votes		1,119,356	100.0

== Republican primary ==
For the first time in a century, the Republican Party failed to field a candidate for statewide office. Illinois state law allows for a candidate to be nominated by getting 5,000 or more write-in votes in the Republican primary or by the Republican Party appointing a candidate to the general election ballot after the primary if they submit 5,000 valid signatures from registered voters. Max Solomon received more than 5,000 write-in votes and became the Republican nominee.

=== Candidates ===
==== Nominee ====
- Max Solomon, perennial candidate

=== Results ===
Republican primary results
Party	Candidate	Votes	%
Republican	Max Solomon (write-in)	22,990	100.0
Total votes		22,990	100.0

== General election ==
=== Results ===
2026 Illinois State Treasurer election
Party	Candidate	Votes	%	±%
Democratic	Mike Frerichs (incumbent)			
Republican	Max Solomon			
Total votes			100.0	
