= 2022 United States Senate election in Illinois =

- November 8, 2022
- Turnout: 53.93% ▼
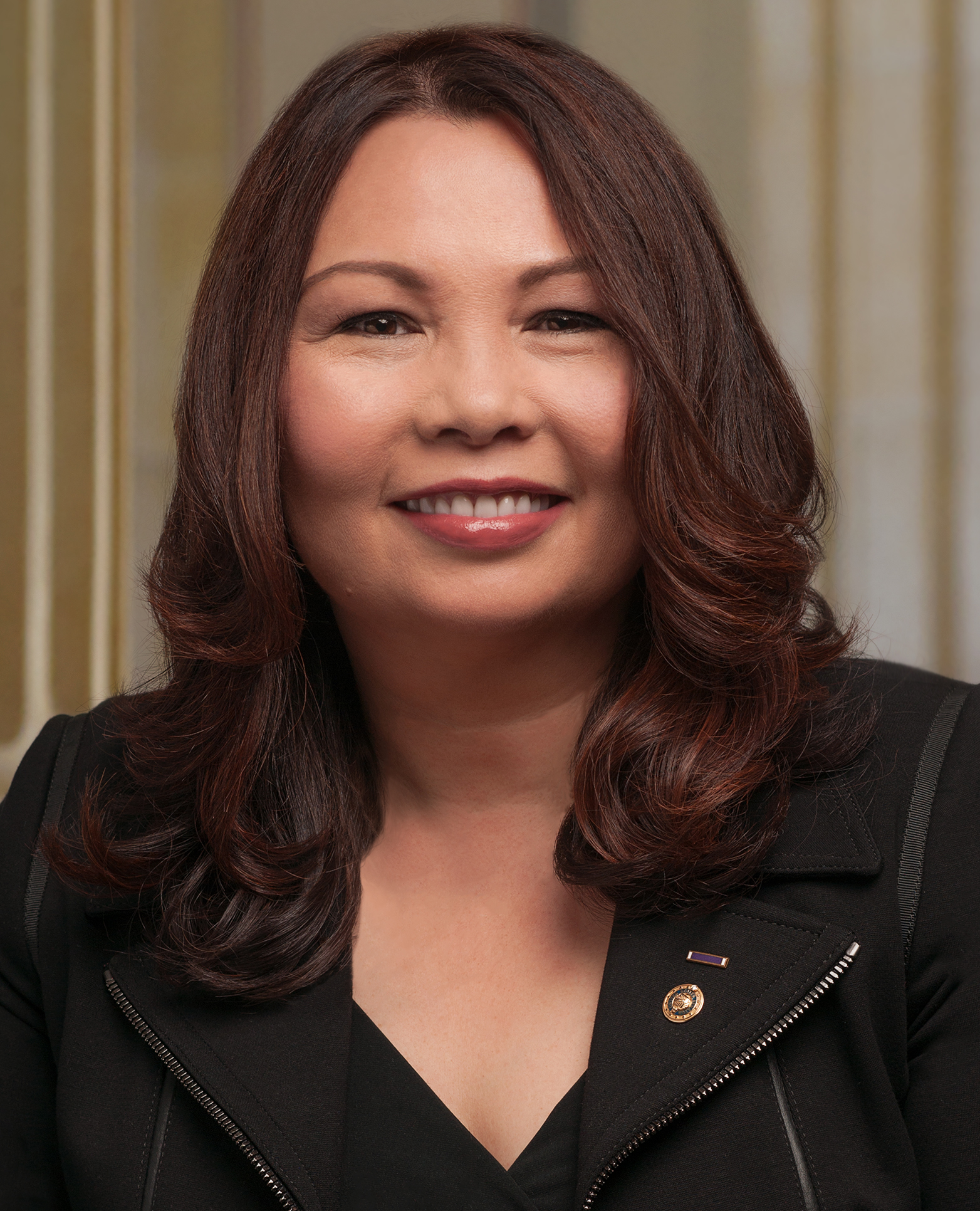

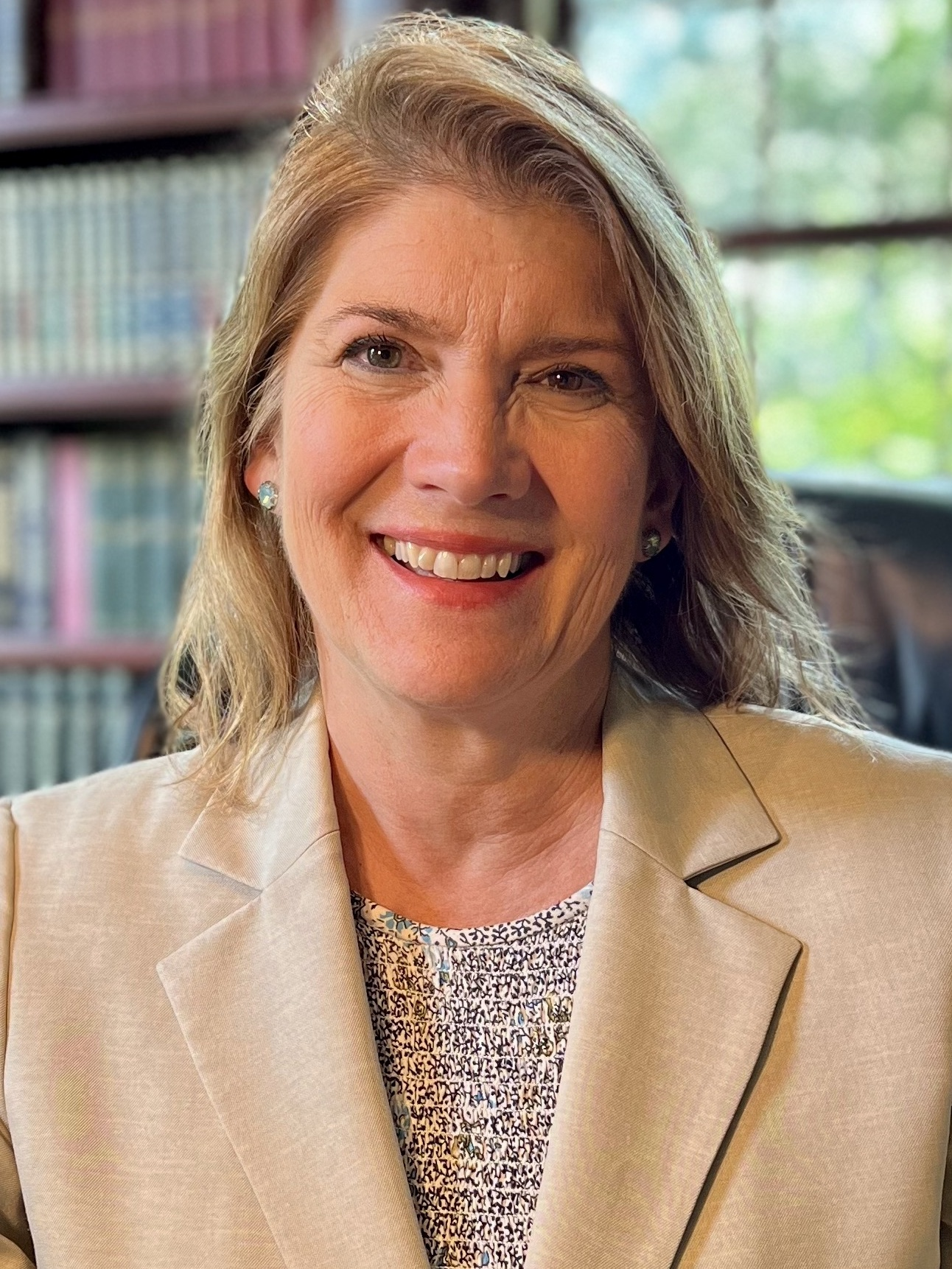
Nominee	Tammy Duckworth	Kathy Salvi
Party	Democratic	Republican
Popular vote	2,329,136	1,701,055
Percentage	56.82%	41.50%
- Duckworth: 40–50% 50–60% 60–70% 70–80% 80–90% >90% Salvi: 40–50% 50–60% 60–70% 70–80% 80–90% >90% Tie: 40–50% 50%
U.S. senator before election
Tammy Duckworth
Democratic
Elected U.S. senator
Tammy Duckworth
Democratic

The 2022 United States Senate election in Illinois was held on November 8, 2022, to elect a member of the United States Senate to represent the state of Illinois.

Incumbent Democratic senator Tammy Duckworth was re-elected for a second term against former U.S. House of Representatives candidate Kathy Salvi, the Republican nominee, winning by a margin of 15.3%, 0.2% more than her 2016 margin. With her victory, Duckworth became the first woman ever to be re-elected for a second term in the state's history. This was also the first U.S. Senate election in the state where both major party candidates were female, the first time since 1986 where a Class 3 Illinois senator was re-elected to a consecutive six-year term, and the first time since 1992 where any party won the seat consecutively.

Despite Duckworth's victory, Salvi flipped seven counties—Calhoun, McDonough, Knox, Gallatin, Pulaski, Alexander, and Madison—that had voted for Duckworth in 2016. Duckworth won Kendall, McLean, Peoria, and Winnebago, which had all voted against her in 2016.

== Democratic primary ==
=== Candidates ===
==== Nominee ====
- Tammy Duckworth, incumbent U.S. senator

=== Endorsements ===
Tammy Duckworth

Organizations

- EMILY's List
- End Citizens United
- Feminist Majority PAC
- Giffords
- Illinois AFL–CIO
- Illinois National Organization for Women
- International Union of Operating Engineers Local 150
- Jewish Dems
- League of Conservation Voters
- Let America Vote
- NARAL Pro-Choice America
- Natural Resources Defense Council
- Planned Parenthood Action Fund
- Population Connection Action Fund
- Women's Political Committee

=== Results ===
Democratic primary results
Party	Candidate	Votes	%
Democratic	Tammy Duckworth (incumbent)	856,720	100.0%
Total votes		856,720	100.0%

== Republican primary ==
=== Candidates ===
==== Nominee ====
- Kathy Salvi, attorney, candidate for Illinois's 8th congressional district in 2006, and wife of former state representative Al Salvi

==== Eliminated in primary ====
- Casey Chlebek, real estate agent
- Matthew Dubiel, owner of WCKG
- Peggy Hubbard, former police officer, U.S. Navy veteran, and candidate for U.S. Senate in 2020
- Bobby Piton, investor and activist
- Jimmy Lee Tillman, founder of New Martin Luther King Republicans, son of former Chicago alderman Dorothy Tillman, and nominee for Illinois's 1st congressional district in 2014 and 2018
- Anthony Williams

==== Disqualified ====
- Tim Arview, insurance agent
- Maryann Mahlen
- Allison Salinas, activist

==== Declined ====
- Tom Demmer, state representative (ran for Illinois treasurer)
- Adam Kinzinger, U.S. representative for Illinois's 16th congressional district

=== Endorsements ===
Bobby Piton

Individuals

- Michael Flynn, former U.S. National security advisor (2017) and former director of the DIA (2012–2014) (Democratic)
Kathy Salvi

State legislators

- Jeanne Ives, former state representative from the 42nd district (2013–2019)

Newspapers

- Chicago Tribune (Republican primary only)
- Daily Herald

Organizations

- Barrington Township Republican Organization
- Bremen Township Republican Organization
- Evanston Township GOP
- Homer Township Republicans
- Illinois Citizens for Life
- Illinois Family Action
- Illinois Federation for Right to Life
- Lake County Republican Party
- McHenry County GOPAC
- McHenry County ProLife Victory PAC
- New Trier GOP
- Niles Township Republicans
- Northfield Township Republican Organization
- Republicans of Wheeling Township
- Sangamon County GOP
- Schaumburg Township Republican Organization
- Winfield Township Republicans

=== Polling ===
Graphical summary

Source of poll aggregation	Dates administered	Dates updated	Casey Chlebek	Matthew Dubiel	Peggy Hubbard	Bobby Piton	Kathy Salvi	Jimmy Lee Tillman	Anthony Williams	Other (Note: Calculated by taking the difference of 100% and all other candidates combined.)	Margin
Real Clear Politics	June 6–13, 2022	June 15, 2022	3.5%	5.5%	14.0%	4.0%	12.5%	1.5%	2.0%	57.0%	Hubbard +1.5

Poll source	Date(s) administered	Sample size (Note: Key: A – all adults RV – registered voters LV – likely voters V – unclear)	Margin of error	Casey Chlebek	Matthew Dubiel	Peggy Hubbard	Maryann Mahlen	Bobby Piton	Kathy Salvi	Jimmy Lee Tillman	Anthony Williams	Undecided
Ogden & Fry (R)	June 24, 2022	518 (LV)	± 4.4%	1%	6%	11%	2%	3%	20%	2%	0%	53%
The Trafalgar Group (R)	June 10–13, 2022	1,075 (LV)	± 2.9%	6%	4%	18%	–	6%	15%	2%	1%	49%
Ogden & Fry (R)	June 11–12, 2022	662 (LV)	± 3.9%	1%	4%	9%	2%	4%	17%	1%	1%	62%
Public Policy Polling (D)	June 6–7, 2022	677 (LV)	± 3.8%	1%	7%	10%	–	2%	10%	1%	3%	66%
Emerson College	May 6–8, 2022	1,000 (LV)	± 3.0%	4%	4%	7%	–	6%	5%	1%	1%	72%

=== Results ===
Results by county Salvi: 20–30%; 30–40%; 40–50%; 50–60%; Hubbard: 20–30%; 30–40%; 40–50%; 50–60%; Dubiel: 20–30%

Republican primary results
Party	Candidate	Votes	%
Republican	Kathy Salvi	216,007	30.23%
Republican	Peggy Hubbard	177,180	24.79%
Republican	Matthew "Matt" Dubiel	90,538	12.67%
Republican	Casey Chlebek	76,213	10.66%
Republican	Robert "Bobby" Piton	65,461	9.16%
Republican	Anthony W. Williams	52,890	7.40%
Republican	Jimmy Lee Tillman II	36,342	5.09%
Total votes		714,631	100.0%

== General election ==
=== Predictions ===
Source	Ranking	As of
The Cook Political Report	Solid D	March 4, 2022
Inside Elections	Solid D	April 1, 2022
Sabato's Crystal Ball	Safe D	March 1, 2022
Politico	Solid D	April 1, 2022
RCP	Likely D	October 26, 2022
Fox News	Solid D	May 12, 2022
DDHQ	Solid D	July 20, 2022
538	Solid D	June 30, 2022
The Economist	Safe D	September 7, 2022

=== Endorsements ===
Tammy Duckworth (D)

U.S. executive branch officials

- Joe Biden, president of the United States (2021–2025)
- Kamala Harris, vice president of the United States (2021–2025)

U.S. senators

- Dick Durbin, U.S. senator from Illinois (1997–present) and Senate majority whip (2021–2025)

Labor unions

- United Mine Workers

Organizations

- EMILY's List
- End Citizens United
- Feminist Majority PAC
- Giffords
- Illinois AFL–CIO
- International Union of Operating Engineers Local 150
- Jewish Dems
- League of Conservation Voters
- Let America Vote
- NARAL Pro-Choice America
- Natural Resources Defense Council
- Planned Parenthood Action Fund
- Population Connection Action Fund
- Sierra Club
- VoteVets.org
- Women's Political Committee

Newspapers

- Chicago Tribune
- Daily Herald
Kathy Salvi (R)

U.S. executive branch officials

- Mike Pompeo, 70th United States secretary of state (2018–2021) and 6th director of the Central Intelligence Agency (2017–2018)

State legislators

- Jeanne Ives, former state representative from the 42nd district (2013–2019)

Local officials

- Richard Irvin, former mayor of Aurora

Newspapers

- The Arab Daily News

Organizations

- Barrington Township Republican Organization
- Bremen Township Republican Organization
- Evanston Township GOP
- Homer Township Republicans
- Huck PAC
- Illinois Citizens for Life
- Illinois Family Action
- Illinois Federation for Right to Life
- Illinois Fraternal Order of Police
- Lake County Republican Party
- McHenry County GOPAC
- McHenry County ProLife Victory PAC
- Moms for America Action
- New Trier GOP
- Niles Township Republicans
- Northfield Township Republican Organization
- Republicans of Wheeling Township
- Sangamon County GOP
- Schaumburg Township Republican Organization
- United Hellenic Voters of America
- Winfield Township Republicans

=== Polling ===
Aggregate polls

Source of poll aggregation	Dates administered	Dates updated	Tammy Duckworth (D)	Kathy Salvi (R)	Undecided (Note: Calculated by taking the difference of 100% and all other candidates combined.)	Margin
FiveThirtyEight	August 25 – November 8, 2022	November 8, 2022	55.5%	40.2%	4.3%	Duckworth +15.3
270towin	October 14 – November 7, 2022	November 8, 2022	51.6%	36.4%	12.0%	Duckworth +15.2
Average			53.6%	38.3%	8.1%	Duckworth +15.3

Graphical summary

Poll source	Date(s) administered	Sample size	Margin of error	Tammy Duckworth (D)	Kathy Salvi (R)	Other	Undecided
Research Co.	November 4–6, 2022	450 (LV)	± 4.6%	55%	38%	2% (Note: Redpath (L) with 2%)	5%
Civiqs	October 22–25, 2022	659 (LV)	± 4.3%	56%	40%	2% (Note: "Someone else" with 2%)	2%
Emerson College	October 20–24, 2022	1,000 (LV)	± 3.0%	49%	39%	3% (Note: Redpath (L) with 2%; "Someone else" with 1%)	8%
Public Policy Polling (D)	October 10–11, 2022	770 (LV)	± 3.5%	50%	36%	5% (Note: Redpath with 5%)	9%
Research America	October 5–11, 2022	1,000 (RV)	± 3.1%	48%	29%	10% (Note: Redpath with 6%; "None" with 4%)	14%
Emerson College	September 21–23, 2022	1,000 (LV)	± 3.0%	50%	31%	4% (Note: "Someone else" with 4%)	16%
Victory Geek (D)	August 25–28, 2022	512 (LV)	± 4.3%	58%	35%	–	7%
Victory Research (R)	July 17–19, 2022	1,208 (LV)	± 2.8%	43%	34%	2% (Note: Redpath with 2%)	20%

Hypothetical polling

Tammy Duckworth vs. generic opponent

Poll source	Date(s) administered	Sample size	Margin of error	Tammy Duckworth (D)	Generic Opponent	Undecided
Victory Research (R)	July 17–19, 2022	1,208 (LV)	± 2.8%	44%	36%	20%

=== Results ===
2022 United States Senate election in Illinois
Party	Candidate	Votes	%	±%
Democratic	Tammy Duckworth (incumbent)	2,329,136	56.82%	+1.96%
Republican	Kathy Salvi	1,701,055	41.50%	+1.72%
Libertarian	Bill Redpath	68,671	1.68%	−1.53%
Write-in		34	0.0%	-0.01%
Total votes		4,098,896	100.0%	
Democratic hold				

==== By county ====
2022 United States Senate election in Illinois (by county)
County	Tammy Duckworth Democratic		Kathy Salvi Republican		Various candidates Other parties		Margin		Total votes cast
County	#	%	#	%	#	%	#	%	Total votes cast
Adams	6,244	25.04%	18,341	73.55%	351	1.41%	-12,097	-48.51%	24,936
Alexander	764	44.76%	930	54.48%	13	0.76%	-166	-9.72%	1,707
Bond	2,061	32.24%	4,193	65.59%	139	2.17%	-2,132	-33.35%	6,393
Boone	7,022	40.09%	10,157	57.98%	338	1.93%	-3,135	-17.89%	17,517
Brown	394	20.77%	1,475	77.75%	28	1.48%	-1,081	-56.98%	1,897
Bureau	5,028	39.68%	7,429	58.63%	213	1.68%	-2,401	-18.95%	12,670
Calhoun	789	33.85%	1,485	63.71%	57	2.45%	-696	-29.86%	2,331
Carroll	2,039	34.25%	3,804	63.90%	110	1.85%	-1,765	-29.65%	5,953
Cass	1,260	32.04%	2,581	65.64%	91	2.31%	-1,321	-33.60%	3,932
Champaign	40,756	60.12%	25,791	38.04%	1,247	1.84%	14,965	22.08%	67,794
Christian	3,865	31.13%	8,222	66.22%	330	2.66%	-4,357	-35.09%	12,417
Clark	1,480	23.43%	4,745	75.13%	91	1.44%	-3,265	-51.70%	6,316
Clay	1,082	18.86%	4,554	79.38%	101	1.76%	-3,472	-60.52%	5,737
Clinton	3,856	26.10%	10,662	72.17%	255	1.73%	-6,806	-46.07%	14,773
Coles	5,924	35.93%	10,270	62.29%	293	1.78%	-4,346	-26.36%	16,487
Cook	1,080,175	74.91%	341,447	23.68%	20,300	1.41%	738,728	51.23%	1,441,922
Crawford	1,685	24.27%	5,100	73.46%	158	2.28%	-3,415	-49.19%	6,943
Cumberland	1,077	22.61%	3,607	75.73%	79	1.66%	-2,530	-53.12%	4,763
DeKalb	17,688	51.27%	16,063	46.56%	747	2.17%	1,625	4.71%	34,498
DeWitt	1,784	29.34%	4,152	68.29%	144	2.37%	-2,638	-38.95%	6,080
Douglas	1,801	27.92%	4,529	70.21%	121	1.88%	-2,728	-42.29%	6,451
DuPage	194,606	56.95%	141,316	41.35%	5,818	1.70%	53,290	15.60%	341,740
Edgar	1,583	26.16%	4,361	72.06%	108	1.78%	-2,778	-45.90%	6,052
Edwards	448	16.10%	2,280	81.93%	55	1.98%	-1,832	-65.83%	2,783
Effingham	3,190	20.14%	12,409	78.33%	293	1.53%	-9,219	-58.19%	15,892
Fayette	1,678	20.96%	6,190	77.33%	137	1.71%	-4,512	-56.37%	8,005
Ford	1,386	27.00%	3,621	70.53%	127	2.47%	-2,235	-43.53%	5,134
Franklin	3,908	28.57%	9,545	69.77%	228	1.67%	-5,637	-41.20%	13,681
Fulton	5,685	43.71%	7,009	53.89%	313	2.41%	-1,324	-10.18%	13,007
Gallatin	753	34.78%	1,373	63.42%	39	1.80%	-620	-28.64%	2,165
Greene	1,144	25.29%	3,297	72.89%	82	1.81%	-2,153	-47.60%	4,523
Grundy	7,685	39.67%	11,266	58.16%	419	2.16%	-3,581	-18.49%	19,370
Hamilton	844	24.84%	2,502	73.63%	52	1.53%	-1,658	-48.79%	3,398
Hancock	1,875	26.03%	5,177	71.88%	150	2.08%	-3,302	-45.85%	7,202
Hardin	402	24.36%	1,220	73.94%	28	1.70%	-818	-49.58%	1,650
Henderson	1,020	35.06%	1,813	62.32%	76	2.61%	-793	-27.26%	2,909
Henry	7,430	37.81%	11,833	60.21%	389	1.98%	-4,403	-22.40%	19,652
Iroquois	2,222	21.29%	8,018	76.82%	198	1.90%	-5,796	-55.53%	10,438
Jackson	9,109	53.30%	7,693	45.02%	287	1.68%	1,416	8.28%	17,089
Jasper	860	18.80%	3,645	79.67%	70	1.53%	-2,785	-60.87%	4,575
Jefferson	3,731	28.45%	9,163	69.86%	222	1.69%	-5,432	-41.41%	13,116
Jersey	2,648	28.60%	6,402	69.14%	210	2.27%	-3,754	-40.54%	9,260
Jo Daviess	3,943	41.66%	5,355	56.58%	167	1.76%	-1,412	-14.92%	9,465
Johnson	1,052	21.86%	3,690	76.67%	71	1.48%	-2,638	-54.81%	4,813
Kane	86,477	54.75%	68,771	43.54%	2,693	1.71%	17,706	11.21%	157,941
Kankakee	14,819	42.21%	19,522	55.61%	767	2.18%	-4,703	-13.40%	35,108
Kendall	23,151	51.15%	21,294	47.04%	820	1.81%	1,857	4.11%	45,265
Knox	8,072	45.95%	9,130	51.98%	364	2.07%	-1,058	-6.03%	17,566
Lake	138,584	60.41%	87,529	38.15%	3,300	1.44%	51,055	22.26%	229,413
LaSalle	18,076	45.67%	20,804	52.56%	698	1.76%	-2,728	-6.89%	39,578
Lawrence	1,178	23.44%	3,745	74.53%	102	2.03%	-2,567	-51.09%	5,025
Lee	4,685	39.04%	7,113	59.27%	204	1.70%	-2,428	-20.23%	12,002
Livingston	3,554	27.77%	9,020	70.48%	224	1.75%	-5,466	-42.71%	12,798
Logan	2,887	29.86%	6,508	67.31%	273	2.82%	-3,621	-37.45%	9,668
Macon	14,573	41.35%	20,042	56.87%	628	1.78%	-5,469	-15.52%	35,243
Macoupin	6,377	35.93%	11,025	62.12%	346	1.95%	-4,648	-26.19%	17,748
Madison	44,273	45.17%	51,858	52.91%	1,883	1.92%	-7,585	-7.74%	98,014
Marion	3,407	26.41%	9,272	71.89%	219	1.70%	-5,865	-45.48%	12,898
Marshall	1,641	34.63%	2,997	63.25%	100	2.11%	-1,356	-28.62%	4,738
Mason	1,739	35.01%	3,135	63.12%	93	1.87%	-1,396	-28.11%	4,967
Massac	1,317	27.09%	3,474	71.45%	71	1.46%	-2,157	-44.36%	4,862
McDonough	3,793	40.41%	5,434	57.89%	159	1.69%	-1,641	-17.48%	9,386
McHenry	56,054	48.18%	57,974	49.83%	2,322	1.99%	-1,920	-1.65%	116,350
McLean	32,188	49.65%	31,353	48.36%	1,286	1.98%	835	1.29%	64,827
Menard	1,655	31.32%	3,469	65.65%	160	3.03%	-1,814	-34.33%	5,284
Mercer	2,559	38.01%	3,945	58.60%	228	3.39%	-1,386	-20.59%	6,732
Monroe	5,197	33.17%	10,240	65.35%	233	1.49%	-5,043	-32.18%	15,670
Montgomery	3,407	32.17%	6,954	65.67%	228	2.15%	-3,547	-33.50%	10,589
Morgan	3,656	33.15%	7,120	64.57%	251	2.28%	-3,464	-31.42%	11,027
Moultrie	1,448	27.58%	3,694	70.36%	108	2.06%	-2,246	-42.78%	5,250
Ogle	6,920	35.67%	12,105	62.39%	377	1.94%	-5,185	-26.72%	19,402
Peoria	30,889	52.32%	27,071	45.86%	1,075	1.82%	3,818	6.46%	59,035
Perry	2,433	31.36%	5,205	67.08%	121	1.56%	-2,772	-35.72%	7,759
Piatt	2,783	36.55%	4,657	61.16%	175	2.30%	-1,874	-24.61%	7,615
Pike	1,308	21.71%	4,611	76.54%	105	1.74%	-3,303	-54.83%	6,024
Pope	357	21.69%	1,265	76.85%	24	1.46%	-908	-55.16%	1,646
Pulaski	730	36.76%	1,231	61.98%	25	1.26%	-501	-25.22%	1,986
Putnam	1,233	44.92%	1,464	53.33%	48	1.75%	-231	-8.41%	2,745
Randolph	3,527	31.14%	7,611	67.19%	189	1.67%	-4,084	-36.05%	11,327
Richland	1,462	23.56%	4,608	74.26%	135	2.18%	-3,146	-50.70%	6,205
Rock Island	26,469	55.18%	20,548	42.83%	955	1.99%	5,921	12.35%	47,972
Saline	2,358	29.30%	5,554	69.02%	135	1.68%	-3,196	-39.72%	8,047
Sangamon	38,056	47.77%	39,389	49.44%	2,221	2.79%	-1,333	-1.67%	79,666
Schuyler	1,007	32.25%	2,027	64.93%	88	2.82%	-1,020	-32.68%	3,122
Scott	465	22.32%	1,588	76.24%	30	1.44%	-1,123	-53.92%	2,083
Shelby	2,304	23.83%	7,177	74.24%	186	1.92%	-4,873	-50.41%	9,667
St. Clair	47,634	53.76%	39,335	44.39%	1,634	1.84%	8,299	9.37%	88,603
Stark	742	32.12%	1,499	64.89%	69	2.99%	-757	-32.77%	2,310
Stephenson	6,914	41.54%	9,393	56.43%	337	2.02%	-2,479	-14.89%	16,644
Tazewell	19,021	37.13%	31,135	60.78%	1,168	2.08%	-12,114	-23.65%	51,324
Union	2,319	33.30%	4,514	64.81%	132	1.90%	-2,195	-31.51%	6,965
Vermilion	7,445	33.90%	14,135	64.36%	382	1.74%	-6,690	-30.46%	21,964
Wabash	899	22.26%	3,083	76.33%	57	1.41%	-2,184	-54.07%	4,039
Warren	2,198	37.55%	3,545	60.56%	111	1.90%	-1,347	-23.01%	5,854
Washington	1,425	23.90%	4,424	74.19%	114	1.91%	-2,999	-50.29%	5,963
Wayne	1,056	15.61%	5,610	82.93%	99	1.46%	-4,554	-67.32%	6,765
White	1,275	22.45%	4,316	76.00%	88	1.55%	-3,041	-53.55%	5,679
Whiteside	8,772	43.98%	10,792	54.11%	380	1.91%	-2,020	-10.13%	19,944
Will	122,189	52.37%	107,581	46.11%	3,551	1.52%	14,608	6.26%	233,321
Williamson	8,067	32.12%	16,665	66.36%	380	1.51%	-8,598	-34.24%	25,112
Winnebago	43,384	49.30%	42,972	48.83%	1,646	1.87%	412	0.47%	88,002
Woodford	4,752	28.16%	11,808	69.98%	313	1.86%	-7,056	-41.82%	16,873
Totals	2,329,136	56.82%	1,701,055	41.50%	68,705	1.68%	628,081	15.32%	4,098,896

==== Counties that flipped from Democratic to Republican ====
- Alexander (largest city: Cairo)
- Calhoun (largest city: Hardin)
- Gallatin (largest city: Shawneetown)
- Knox (largest city: Galesburg)
- Madison (largest city: Granite City)
- McDonough (largest city: Macomb)
- Pulaski (largest city: Mounds)

==== Counties that flipped from Republican to Democratic ====
- Kendall (largest city: Oswego)
- McLean (largest city: Bloomington)
- Peoria (largest city: Peoria)
- Winnebago (largest city: Rockford)

==== By congressional district ====
Duckworth won 14 of 17 congressional districts.

District	Duckworth	Salvi	Representative
1st	69%	29%	Bobby Rush (117th Congress)
1st	69%	29%	Jonathan Jackson (118th Congress)
2nd	68%	30%	Robin Kelly
3rd	69%	29%	Marie Newman (117th Congress)
3rd	69%	29%	Delia Ramirez (118th Congress)
4th	70%	28%	Chuy García
5th	70%	29%	Mike Quigley
6th	55%	43%	Sean Casten
7th	86%	13%	Danny Davis
8th	56%	42%	Raja Krishnamoorthi
9th	72%	27%	Jan Schakowsky
10th	61%	37%	Brad Schneider
11th	56%	42%	Bill Foster
12th	30%	68%	Mike Bost
13th	56%	42%	Nikki Budzinski
14th	54%	44%	Lauren Underwood
15th	32%	66%	Mary Miller
16th	39%	60%	Darin LaHood
17th	52%	45%	Cheri Bustos (117th Congress)
17th	52%	45%	Eric Sorensen (118th Congress)

== See also ==
- 2022 United States Senate elections
