= Eric Sorensen =

Eric Sorensen may refer to:

- Eric Sorensen (civil servant), English civil servant
- Eric Sorensen (journalist), Canadian journalist
- Eric Sorensen (politician) (born 1976), American politician

== See also ==
- Eric Sörensen (1913–1990), Swedish equestrian
- Erik Sørensen (born 1940), Danish footballer
