= Bobby Piton =

2022 Illinois Senate candidate

Bobby Piton was an Illinois Senate candidate who ran for office in the 2022 midterms.

== Biography ==
Piton is a financial manager and father of five, with strong Christian fundamental beliefs. A proponent of baseless claims of fraud in the 2020 presidential election, despite receiving only 9% of the vote in his 2022 race, Piton refused to concede his election loss claiming hacked voting machines and the "uniparty" contributed to his loss.

Piton was a witness in the November 30, 2020 hearing in which Trump attorneys Rudy Giuliani, Jenna Ellis, and Michael Flynn associate Colonel Phil Waldron, presented testimony arranged by Arizona legislators Mark Finchem, Kelly Townsend, David Cook, among others. Per the hearing transcript, Piton was introduced by Liz Harris (Arizona politician) who Piton was working with at the time carrying out a canvassing effort, presenting Piton's data introducing he believed the 2020 election was rigged by "phantom voters," which Harris claimed her group was working on validating through a canvass effort.

In late April 2021, as the Arizona audit was underway, Piton had a private meeting with Arizona legislators including Congressman Andy Biggs, to push the Arizona audit which he live-streamed to the internet.

Piton appeared in the Arizona audit documentary The Deep Rig, created by Patrick Byrne in which audit leader Doug Logan also appeared to promote the Arizona audit effort.
