= Jennifer Steinhauer =

American reporter for The New York Times (born 1969)

- Born: Jennifer Elizabeth Steinhauer; February 16, 1969 (age 57); Michigan
- Education: School of Visual Arts (BFA)
- Occupations: Journalist, author, columnist
- Years active: 1989–present
- Employers: The New York Times; Food52
- Notable credits: New York Times; The Firsts (2020); Beverly Hills Adjacent (2009)
- Spouse: Edward Andrew Wyatt (m. 1997; div. 2015)
- Partner: Jonathan Weisman (2015–present)
- Children: 2
- Website: jennifersteinhauer.com

Jennifer Elizabeth Steinhauer (born February 16, 1969) is an American reporter for The New York Times who has covered the United States Congress since February 2010. She joined The Times in 1989 in New York where she was City Hall Bureau Chief and later moved to Los Angeles where she was the Los Angeles Bureau Chief.

In February 2010, Steinhauer moved to Washington D.C., to become a Congressional Reporter for The New York Times.

She co-authored a novel, Beverly Hills Adjacent with Jessica Hendra.

== Early years and career ==
Steinhauer was born on February 16, 1969 in southwestern Michigan. She is the daughter of Joel Steinhauer, who worked as a union representative for the Michigan Education Association, and Lynn Steinhauer, who is a licensed social worker.

Steinhauer attended the School of Visual Arts (SVA) in New York, where she studied journalism, eventually graduating with a BFA in Communication Arts in 1990. In 1989, she began working as a copy girl for The New York Times, while she was still a student at SVA.

== Personal life ==
Until 2015, Steinhauer was married to fellow Times writer Ed Wyatt; the couple have two daughters. Steinhauer currently lives in the American University Park neighbourhood of Washington, D.C., with her partner and Times journalist, Jonathan Weisman, along with their 4 daughters (both Steinhauer and Weisman had 2 children from a previous marriage).

Steinhauer was the daughter of an interfaith couple (her father practiced Christianity, while her mother practiced Judaism) and ultimately chose to practice Judaism. Her marriage to Ed Wyatt was performed by Rabbi Judith Lewis In New York.

Steinhauer, herself a graduate of an art school, has suggested that the need for a degree from an elite college (or a college degree at all) is overstated. She has often tweeted the work of her Times colleague and cookbook co-author, Frank Bruni, who has published a number of pieces on the subject.

== Awards ==
In 2006, Steinhauer won the Newswomen's Club of New York Front Page Deadline Reporting Award for her work on Hurricane Katrina.
