= Dot Foods =

American food redistributor

Dot Foods, Inc.
- Type: Private - Family owned
- Industry: Food redistribution
- Founded: 1960
- Headquarters: Mount Sterling, Illinois, United States
- Key people: Dick Tracy (CEO); George Eversman (President)
- Revenue: $10.6 billion (2024)
- Number of employees: 6,300
- Website: www.dotfoods.com

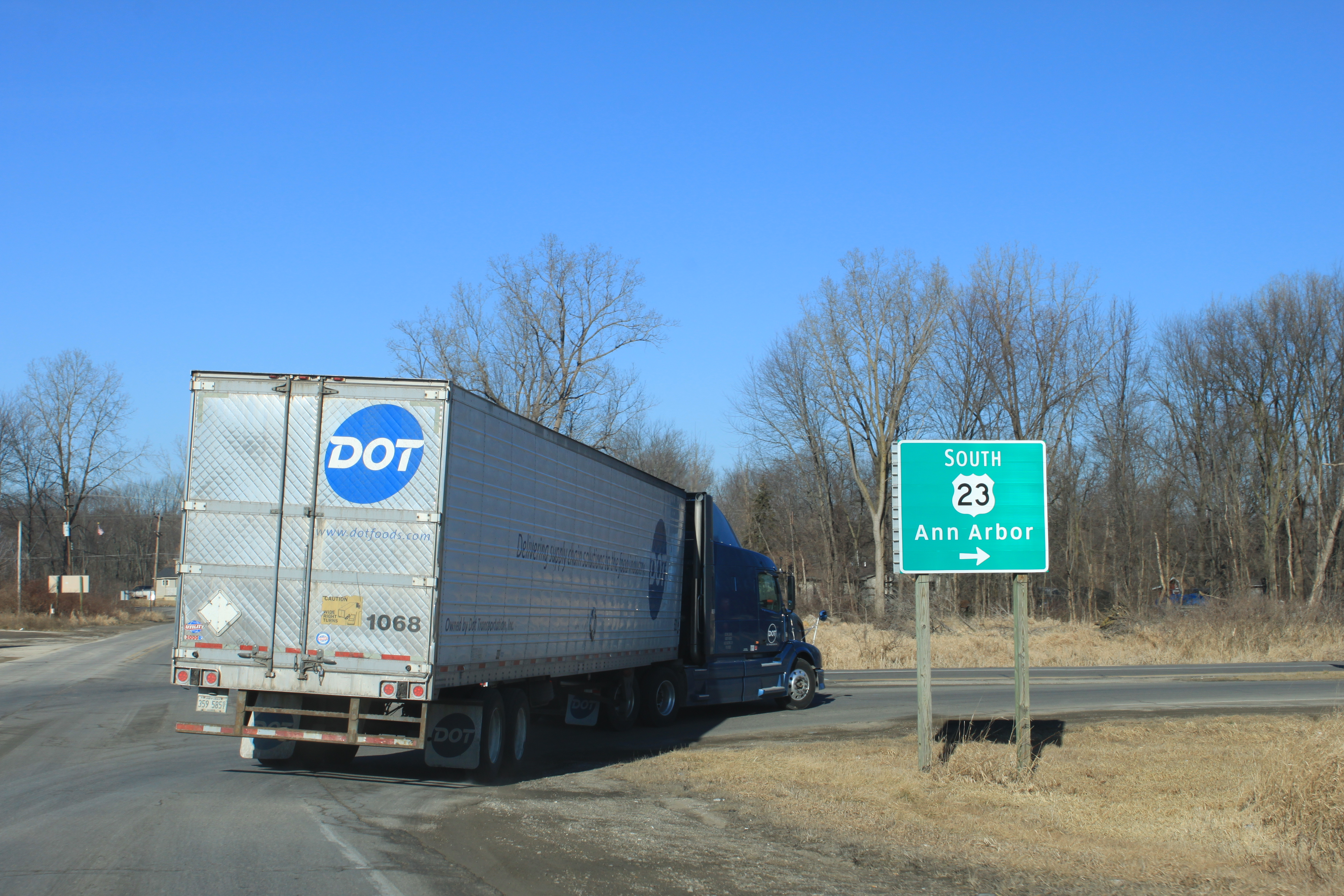
Dot Foods distribution truck, Whitmore Lake, Michigan

Dot Foods is the largest foodservice redistribution company in the United States. Dot offers over 123,500 products from 1,530 food industry manufacturers. Dot consolidates those products and delivers in less-than-truckload (LTL) quantities to distributors nationwide on a weekly basis. Distributors can purchase a combination of products with various temperature requirements as long as the combined total weight is at least 5,000 pounds.

== History ==
Dot Foods was founded in 1960, by Robert F. Tracy, and was originally named Associated Dairy Products to reflect the nature of the business at the time. Tracy began the enterprise by selling an assortment of dairy products from the back of the family station wagon. Tracy was originally from Jerseyville, Illinois, and moved to Mount Sterling after his marriage.

In 2016, Dot Foods was listed at number 55 on Forbes' list of America's Largest Private Companies with a reported revenue of $6.2 billion.

In 2017, John Tracy moved from CEO to executive chairman in the company, and his brother, Joe Tracy, became CEO. Another brother, Dick Tracy, was appointed president. All three are sons of founder Robert Tracy and his wife, Dorothy.

== Locations ==
Dot Foods has fifteen locations including its headquarters:

- Mount Sterling, Illinois (headquarters, distribution center)
- Ardmore, Oklahoma
- Bear, Delaware
- Bullhead City, Arizona
- Burley, Idaho
- Cambridge City, Indiana
- Chesterfield, Missouri (Sales headquarters, offices only)
- Dyersburg, Tennessee
- Liverpool, New York
- Manchester, Tennessee
- Modesto, California
- Vidalia, Georgia
- Williamsport, Maryland
- University Park, Illinois
