= Illinois Gaming Board =

Gaming control board in Illinois

Illinois Gaming Control Board
Board overview
- Jurisdiction: State of Illinois
- Headquarters: 160 North LaSalle Street Chicago, Illinois
- Board executive: Dionne R. Hayden, Chair
- Website: igb.illinois.gov

Map

The Illinois Gaming Board (IGB) is the state agency in Illinois that regulates the state's gaming industry. The Board controls regulatory oversight and tax collection for video gaming and riverboat casinos. The Board has five members, selected by the Governor and approved by the Senate.

In mid-2026, Illinois Governor JB Pritzker signed Senate Bill 2749 into law, effectively expanding the Illinois Gaming Board's ability to take action to address "gambling-related harm".

== History ==
The Illinois Gaming Board was established following the enactment of the Riverboat Gambling Act in February 1990, making Illinois the second state in the nation to legalize riverboat casino gambling. The first riverboat casino, the Argosy Casino Alton, began operations on September 11, 1991. Initially, the Board was authorized to issue up to ten casino licenses, a limit that remained in place for nearly three decades. In July 2009, the Video Gaming Act was signed into law, authorizing the operation of Video Gaming Terminals (VGTs) in licensed retail establishments, truck stops, and fraternal or veterans' organizations. The first legal VGTs went live for patron play on September 10, 2012. Under the original 2009 Act, licensed establishments were limited to a maximum of five VGTs per location.

== 2019 Gaming Expansion ==
On June 28, 2019, Governor J. B. Pritzker signed Public Act 101–0031, which expanded gaming in the state. The legislation authorized six new casino licenses, including one for the city of Chicago, and legalized sports wagering. The Act increased the maximum number of VGTs allowed in a single establishment from five to six machines. It also increased the maximum wager from $2 to $4 and raised the maximum cash award to $1,195.

== 2026 VGT Chicago Legalization ==
While the 2009 Video Gaming Act allowed statewide VGT operation, Chicago maintained a municipal ban on the machines for several years. In late 2025, the Chicago City Council moved to lift the ban to address pension funding requirements. The legalization faced debate regarding the potential impact on the city's casino revenue. By January 2026, city officials continued to weigh regulatory changes and tax structures associated with the introduction of VGTs in Chicago establishments.

== Licensed Video Gaming Terminal Operators ==
The Illinois video gaming market is highly concentrated, with a small number of licensed terminal operators controlling a significant majority of the state's distributed gaming network. As of late 2025, over 49,000 video gaming terminals (VGTs) were in operation across approximately 8,700 licensed establishments statewide. The Illinois Gaming Board provides regulatory oversight for these operators, publishing monthly reports that detail net terminal income and tax contributions to the Capital Projects Fund and local municipalities.

== Sports wagering and regulatory landscape ==
In July 2024, the state implemented a new progressive tax structure for sports betting, with rates ranging from 20% to 40% based on adjusted gross receipts (AGR). By early 2026, the IGB became involved in a jurisdictional dispute as state lawmakers introduced Senate Bill 2800 to prevent the City of Chicago from imposing an additional 10.25% local tax on sportsbooks, asserting that the state holds exclusive authority over gaming regulation.

== Board members ==
- Dionne R. Hayden
- Sean Brannon
- Stephen R. Ferrara
- Caleb J. Melamed
