= National Register of Historic Places listings in Marion County, Missouri =

Location of Marion County in Missouri

The following properties are listed on the National Register of Historic Places in Marion County, Missouri.

This is intended to be a complete list of the properties and districts on the National Register of Historic Places in Marion County, Missouri, United States. Latitude and longitude coordinates are provided for many National Register properties and districts; these locations may be seen together in a map.

There are 41 properties and districts listed on the National Register in the county, including 1 National Historic Landmark.

This National Park Service list is complete through NPS recent listings posted September 4, 2026.

== Current listings ==
	Name on the Register	Image	Date listed	Location	City or town	Description
1	Levi Barkley House		March 2, 1984 (#84002583)	West of Hannibal; 39°44′04″N 91°29′51″W	Hannibal	
2	Broadway District	Broadway District	August 1, 1986 (#86002128)	Roughly bounded by S. Main, Broadway, and S. 3rd Sts. 39°42′34″N 91°21′22″W	Hannibal	
3	Buildings at 207–209 South Main St.	Buildings at 207–209 South Main St.	August 1, 1986 (#86002129)	207–209 S. Main St. 39°42′30″N 91°21′17″W	Hannibal	
4	Central Park Historic District	Central Park Historic District	October 7, 1982 (#82000586)	Roughly bounded by 4th, 7th, North, and Lyon Sts. 39°42′32″N 91°21′36″W	Hannibal	
5	Clemens Field	Clemens Field	August 26, 2008 (#08000807)	401 Collier St. 39°42′19″N 91°21′23″W	Hannibal	
6	Culbertson-Head Farmstead	Culbertson-Head Farmstead	September 4, 2008 (#08000838)	7178 County Road 402; 39°47′41″N 91°30′33″W	Palmyra	
7	Davidson Building	Davidson Building	August 1, 1986 (#86002130)	106 S. Main St. 39°42′34″N 91°21′18″W	Hannibal	
8	Digel Block	Digel Block	August 1, 1986 (#86002131)	218-222 S. Main St. 39°42′30″N 91°21′15″W	Hannibal	
9	Dryden-Louthan House	Dryden-Louthan House	January 18, 1985 (#85000104)	402 E. Ross St. 39°47′40″N 91°31′09″W	Palmyra	
10	Ebert-Dulany House	Ebert-Dulany House	February 17, 1983 (#83001030)	1000 Center St. 39°42′24″N 91°21′13″W	Hannibal	
11	Eighth and Center Streets Baptist Church	Eighth and Center Streets Baptist Church	September 4, 1980 (#80002376)	722 Center St. 39°42′28″N 91°21′48″W	Hannibal	
12	Robert Elliott's Wholesale Grocery	Robert Elliott's Wholesale Grocery	August 1, 1986 (#86002132)	116-120 S. 3rd St. 39°42′31″N 91°21′22″W	Hannibal	
13	Federal Building	Federal Building	October 15, 1980 (#80002377)	600 Broadway; 39°42′29″N 91°21′33″W	Hannibal	
14	Gardner House	Gardner House	March 4, 1971 (#71000470)	421 Hamilton and Main Sts. 39°47′46″N 91°31′20″W	Palmyra	
15	Green Double House	Green Double House	August 1, 1986 (#86002133)	113-115 S. 3rd St. 39°42′31″N 91°21′24″W	Hannibal	
16	Hafner Grocery Warehouse		August 1, 1986 (#86002134)	101 E. Church St. 39°42′34″N 91°21′12″W	Hannibal	
17	Hannibal Lime Company Office		September 6, 1984 (#84002585)	623 Collier St. 39°42′18″N 91°21′34″W	Hannibal	
18	Hannibal Old Police Station and Jail	Hannibal Old Police Station and Jail	July 17, 1979 (#79001381)	4th and Church Sts. 39°42′27″N 91°21′26″W	Hannibal	
19	Hendren Farm		August 22, 1984 (#84002587)	Route 2; 39°44′59″N 91°26′27″W	Hannibal	
20	Hock Building	Hock Building	December 2, 1986 (#86003588)	312 Center St. 39°42′35″N 91°21′29″W	Hannibal	
21	Holmes-Dakin Building		August 1, 1986 (#86002135)	120-122 S. Main St. 39°42′33″N 91°21′17″W	Hannibal	
22	Benjamin Horr House	Benjamin Horr House	December 2, 1986 (#86003587)	308 Center St. 39°42′36″N 91°21′27″W	Hannibal	
23	Lock and Dam No. 21 Historic District	Lock and Dam No. 21 Historic District	March 10, 2004 (#04000181)	Mississippi River south of West Quincy; 39°54′22″N 91°25′56″W	West Quincy	Extends into Adams County, Illinois
24	Maple Avenue Historic District	Maple Avenue Historic District	November 21, 2002 (#02001404)	Roughly bounded by Broadway and Center St., the alley to North St., and Dulany to Section; 39°42′30″N 91°21′59″W	Hannibal	
25	Marion County Courthouse	Marion County Courthouse	October 22, 2002 (#02001194)	906 Broadway; 39°42′30″N 91°21′51″W	Hannibal	
26	Marion County Jail and Jailor's House	Marion County Jail and Jailor's House	October 4, 2002 (#02001100)	210 W. Lafayette St. 39°47′55″N 91°31′28″W	Palmyra	
27	Mark Twain Historic District	Mark Twain Historic District	January 4, 1978 (#78003398)	Bird, Main, and Hill Sts. 39°42′43″N 91°21′25″W	Hannibal	
28	Mark Twain Hotel	Mark Twain Hotel	August 1, 1986 (#86002136)	200 S. Main St. 39°42′33″N 91°21′17″W	Hannibal	
29	Robert Masterson House		April 5, 1984 (#84002591)	Northwest of Hannibal; 39°46′02″N 91°28′20″W	Hannibal	
30	North Main Street Historic District	North Main Street Historic District	August 1, 1986 (#86002137)	Roughly bounded by Bird, N. Main, and Hill Sts. 39°42′40″N 91°21′22″W	Hannibal	
31	Osterhout Mound Park	Osterhout Mound Park	April 11, 1973 (#73001045)	Wauneta Pl. 39°43′00″N 91°23′43″W	Hannibal	
32	Riverview Park	Riverview Park	September 6, 2005 (#05000998)	2000 Harrison Hill; 39°43′29″N 91°22′18″W	Hannibal	
33	Rockcliffe Mansion	Rockcliffe Mansion	September 18, 1980 (#80002378)	1000 Bird St. 39°42′29″N 91°21′57″W	Hannibal	
34	St. Elizabeth Hospital	St. Elizabeth Hospital	August 14, 2012 (#12000500)	109 Virginia St. 39°42′14″N 91°22′51″W	Hannibal	
35	Sharkey Mound Group		December 18, 1973 (#73001046)	Address Restricted	Hannibal	
36	Peter J. Sowers House	Peter J. Sowers House	January 18, 1985 (#85000105)	221 Home St. 39°47′52″N 91°31′12″W	Palmyra	
37	Speigle House	Speigle House	February 14, 1985 (#85000283)	406 S. Dickerson; 39°47′48″N 91°31′28″W	Palmyra	
38	Standard Printing Company	Standard Printing Company	August 1, 1986 (#86002138)	201 N. 3rd St. 39°42′36″N 91°21′28″W	Hannibal	
39	Mark Twain Boyhood Home	Mark Twain Boyhood Home	October 15, 1966 (#66000419)	206-208 Hill St. 39°42′44″N 91°21′28″W	Hannibal	
40	Walker-Woodward-Schaffer House	Walker-Woodward-Schaffer House	February 16, 1984 (#84002592)	1425 S. Main St. 39°47′13″N 91°31′23″W	Palmyra	
41	Ephraim J. Wilson Farm Complex		December 28, 1982 (#82000587)	East of Palmyra off Route 168; 39°45′45″N 91°29′16″W	Palmyra	

== See also ==
- List of National Historic Landmarks in Missouri
- National Register of Historic Places listings in Missouri
