= Warden's House =

Warden's House may refer to:

- Wheeler National Wildlife Refuge Warden's Residence, Triana, Alabama, listed on the National Register of Historic Places (NRHP)
- Warden's House (Alcatraz Island), California
- Deputy Warden's House, Canon City, Colorado, NRHP-listed in Fremont County
- Henry County Courthouse, Jail, and Warden's House, New Castle, Kentucky, NRHP-listed in Henry County
- Warden's House-Old Louisiana State Penitentiary, Baton Rouge, Louisiana, NRHP-listed in East Baton Rouge Parish
- Warden's House Museum, Stillwater, Minnesota, NRHP-listed
- Missouri State Penitentiary Warden's House, Jefferson City, Missouri, NRHP-listed in Cole County
- Marion County Jail and Jailor's House, Palmyra, Missouri, NRHP-listed in Marion County
- Warden's House (McAlester, Oklahoma), NRHP-listed
