= Gap View Farm =

Historic house in West Virginia, United States

- U.S. National Register of Historic Places
- U.S. Historic district
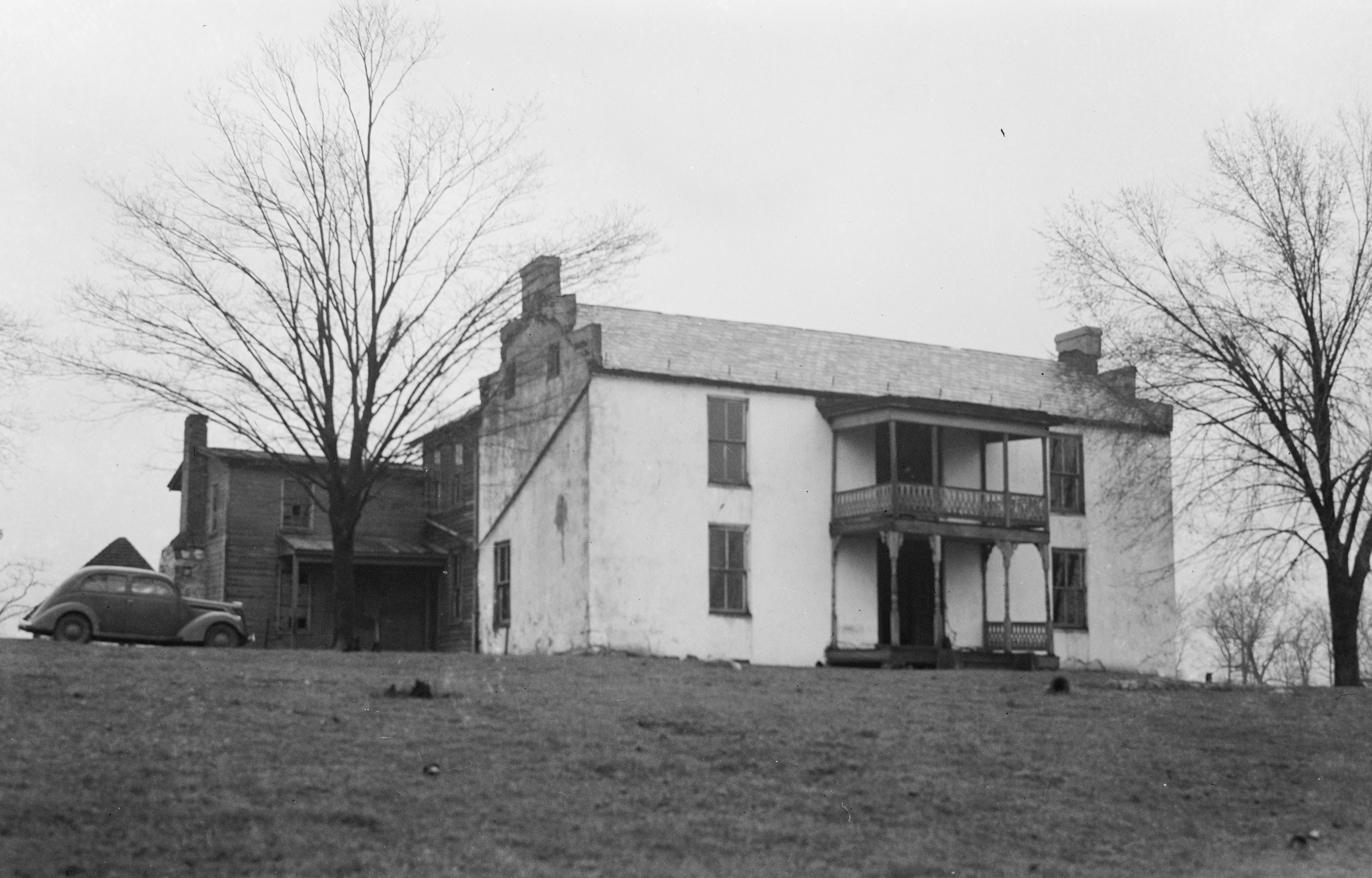
- Farmhouse in the 1930s

- Location within West Virginia Location within the United States
- Nearest city: Charles Town, West Virginia
- Coordinates: 39°20′37.57″N 77°50′55.00″W
- Built: 1774
- Architect: Walter Baker
- Architectural style: Georgian, Colonial Revival
- NRHP reference No.: 96001574
- Added to NRHP: January 9, 1997

Gap View Farm is a historic farm complex near Charles Town, West Virginia. Built in 1774, the farm was placed on the National Register of Historic Places on January 9, 1997.

== Name ==
The property gets its name from its view of the gap in the Blue Ridge Mountains made by the Potomac River at Harpers Ferry.

== History ==
Walter Baker came to then, Berkeley County, Virginia, in 1770 and began clearing the property. A small limestone house was built by Baker in 1750, on property that was granted to Henry Lloyd by Thomas Fairfax, 6th Lord Fairfax of Cameron. The main house of the farm was built by Baker in 1774. At Baker's death in 1820, the property was sold by Baker's widow, Jacobina, to James L. Ranson. When Ranson fell on hard times, he sold it to Parker Strode in 1868. In 1871, the property was acquired by Charles Aglionby, who owned the adjoining Mount Pleasant estate and a portion of Media Farm. Over time the house was expanded in four phases. In 1937, the farm was again sold to a family by the name of Barlett.

In 1954, the farm was purchased by World War I veteran Frank Buckles and his wife Audrey (who died in 1999). Their daughter Susannah was born there in 1955, and she returned to live there after her mother's death. Buckles would ultimately become the last American survivor of World War I, and lived there until his death on February 27, 2011, aged 110.

On January 9, 1997, the farm and property were placed on the National Register of Historic Places.

== Description ==
Gap view is a two-story three-bay brick house, with prominent stepped parapets at the gable ends. As originally built, it was arranged with a side hall plan, that was later changed to a center hall arrangement.

== Conservation ==
Susannah Mayo Buckles, daughter of Frank Buckles, runs the day-to-day operations of the farm and has made the farm more eco-friendly. In May 2008, volunteers planted over 1,000 trees and shrubs on the farm.

Many local agencies have worked to plant trees and shrubs, as well as wetland species of trees and shrubs, along the property's stream and wetland areas.

Ms. Buckles also installed 15,000 feet of fencing as part land retirement program called the Conservation Reserve Enhancement Program. The fencing separated the farm's conservation areas from the farm's other residents, 130 head of cattle.

In July 2009, it was announced that the farm was in the running for the West Virginia Conservation Farmer of the Year, though it is unclear if the farm won. The farm had won Jefferson County Conservation Farmer of the Year in 2009.
