= Frank Buckles =

American World War I veteran and supercentenarian (1901–2011)

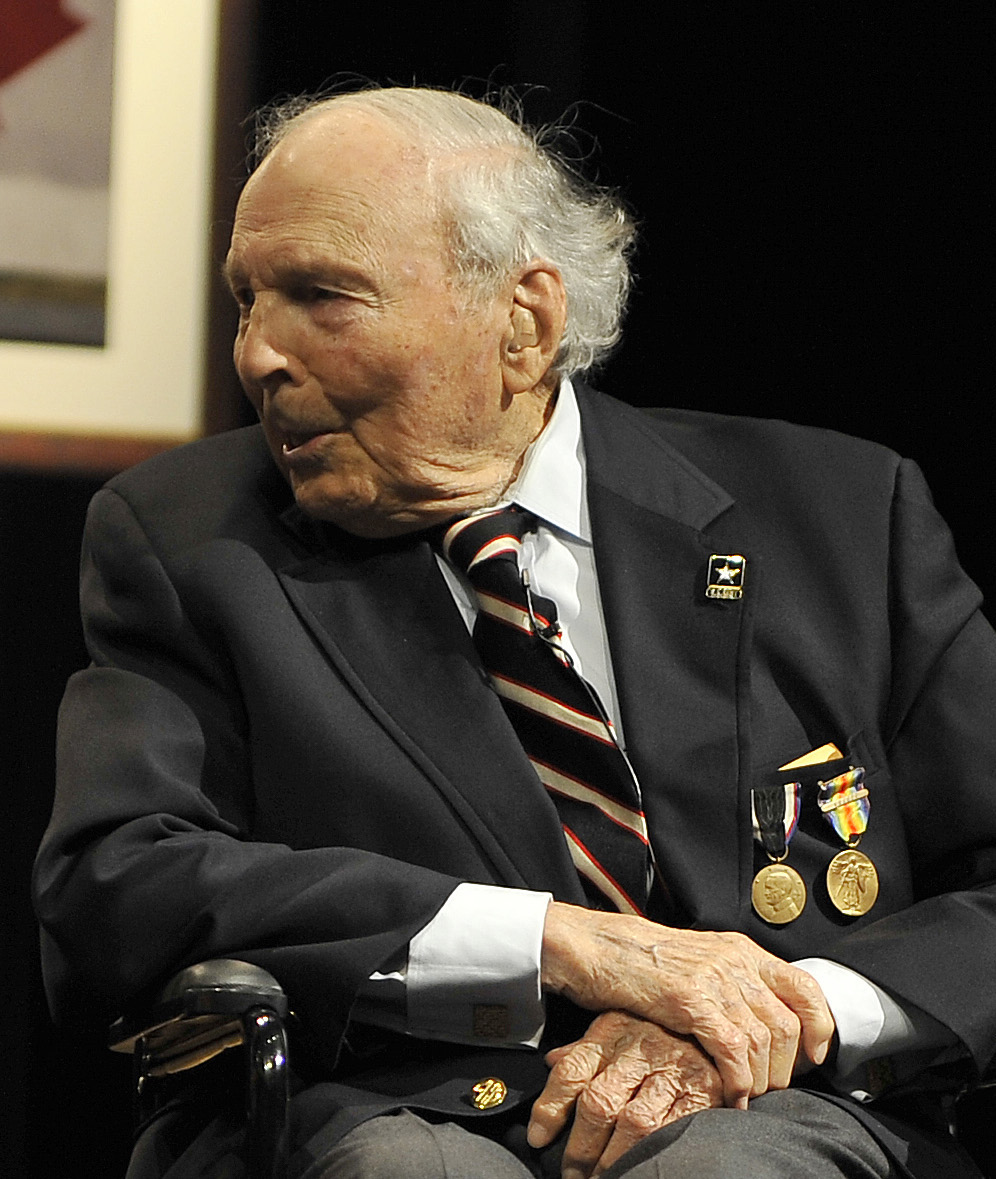
- Buckles on March 6, 2008
- Born: Wood Buckles; February 1, 1901; Bethany, Missouri, U.S.
- Died: February 27, 2011 (aged 110); Charles Town, West Virginia, U.S.
- Burial place: Arlington National Cemetery
- Military career
- Allegiance: United States
- Branch: United States Army
- Service years: August 1917 – November 1919
- Rank: Corporal
- Service number: 15577
- Unit: 1st Fort Riley Casual Detachment
- Conflicts: World War I
- Awards: World War I Victory Medal; Army of Occupation of Germany Medal; French Legion of Honor

Frank Woodruff Buckles (born Wood Buckles; February 1, 1901 – February 27, 2011) was a United States Army corporal and the last surviving American veteran of World War I. He enlisted in the U.S. Army in 1917 at age 16 and served with the 1st Fort Riley Casual Detachment in Europe, where he worked as an ambulance driver and later helped escort prisoners of war.

During World War II, Buckles was working as a civilian in the shipping business in the Philippines when Japanese forces captured him. He spent more than three years as a civilian prisoner of war, including captivity at the University of Santo Tomas internment camp and Los Baños.

== Early life and education ==
Buckles was born to James Clark Buckles, a farmer, and Theresa J. Buckles (née Keown) in Bethany, Missouri, on February 1, 1901. He had two older brothers, Ashman and Roy, and two older sisters, Grace and Gladys. Several family members lived long lives; he remembered speaking with his grandfather who was born in 1817, and his father lived to be 94. His ancestry included soldiers of the Revolutionary and Civil Wars. His lineage goes back to Robert Buckles, born May 1702, who immigrated to the United States from England. Robert's descendants served in every major war since the American Revolutionary War including the American Civil War, World War I, World War II, and the Vietnam War.

In 1903, Frank—then known as Wood—and his brother Ashman contracted scarlet fever. Frank survived, but Ashman died from the disease aged four. Between 1911 and 1916, Buckles attended school in Walker, Missouri. Later, he and his family moved to Oakwood, Oklahoma, where he continued his schooling and worked at a bank. He was an amateur wireless operator, and an avid reader of newspapers.

== World War I and interwar years ==
Five months after the American entry into World War I, Buckles sought to enlist in the armed forces. He was turned down by the Marine Corps for being too small, and by the Navy, which claimed that he had flat feet. He fared better with the Army, which accepted that he was an adult even though he looked no older than his 16 years. A sergeant advised that a middle initial would be helpful, so he adopted his uncle's name, "Frank Woodruff Buckles". Another sergeant suggested that the quickest way to the front lines would be to seek a position driving ambulances.

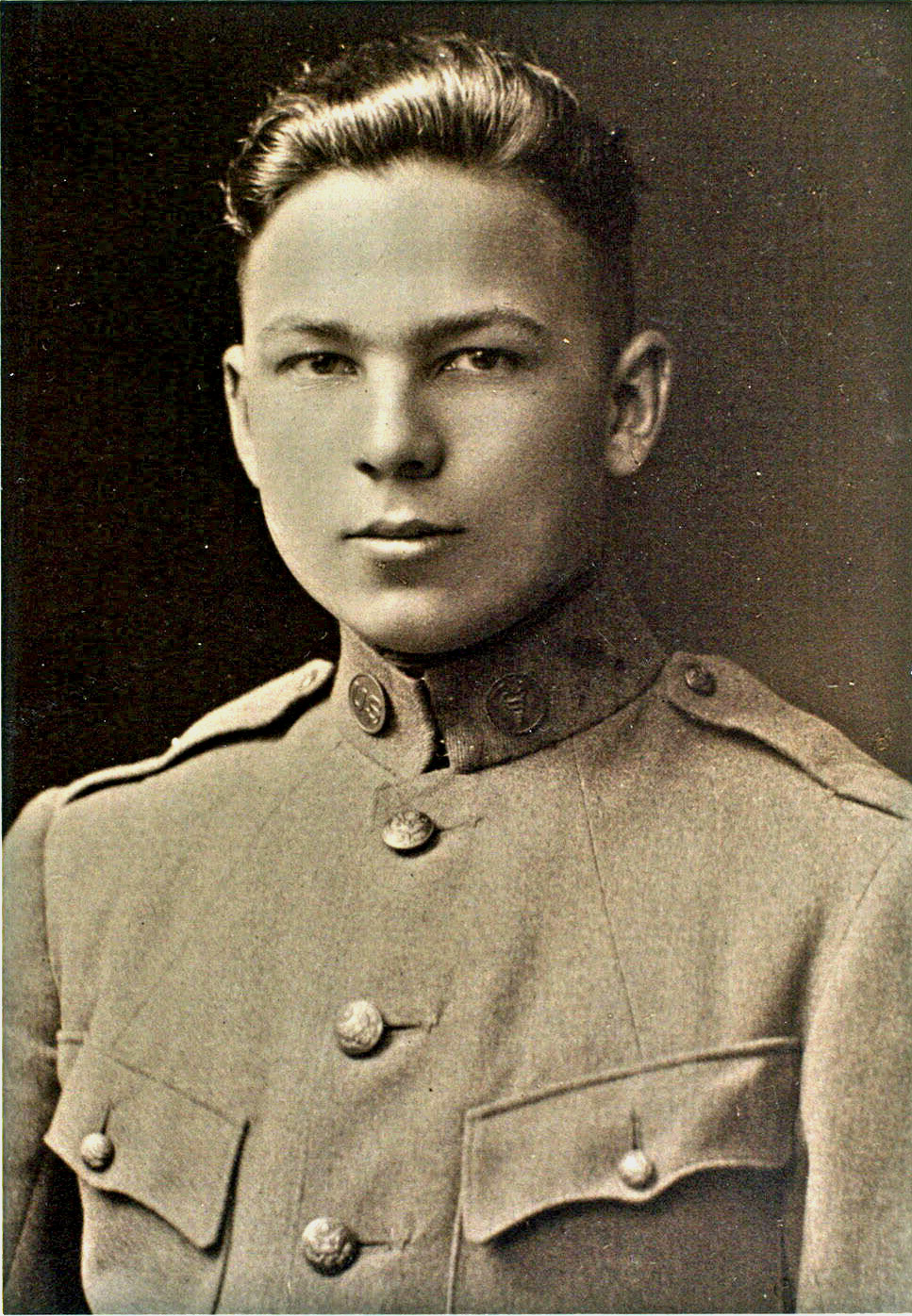
Buckles upon his national service recruitment, aged 16 (1917)

Buckles enlisted on August 14, 1917, and went through basic training at Fort Riley in Kansas. Later that year, he embarked for Europe aboard the RMS Carpathia, famous for rescuing the survivors of Titanic in 1912, which was being used as a troop ship. During the war, Buckles drove ambulances and motorcycles for the Army's 1st Fort Riley Casual Detachment, first in England and then France. He later recalled his service as a doughboy:

There was never a shortage of blown-up bodies that needed to be rushed to the nearest medical care. The British and French troops were in bad shape – even guys about my age looked old and tired. After three years of living and dying inside a dirt trench, you know the Brits and French were happy to see us "doughboys." Every last one of us Yanks believed we'd wrap this thing up in a month or two and head back home before harvest. In other words, we were the typical, cocky Americans no one wants around, until they need help winning a war.

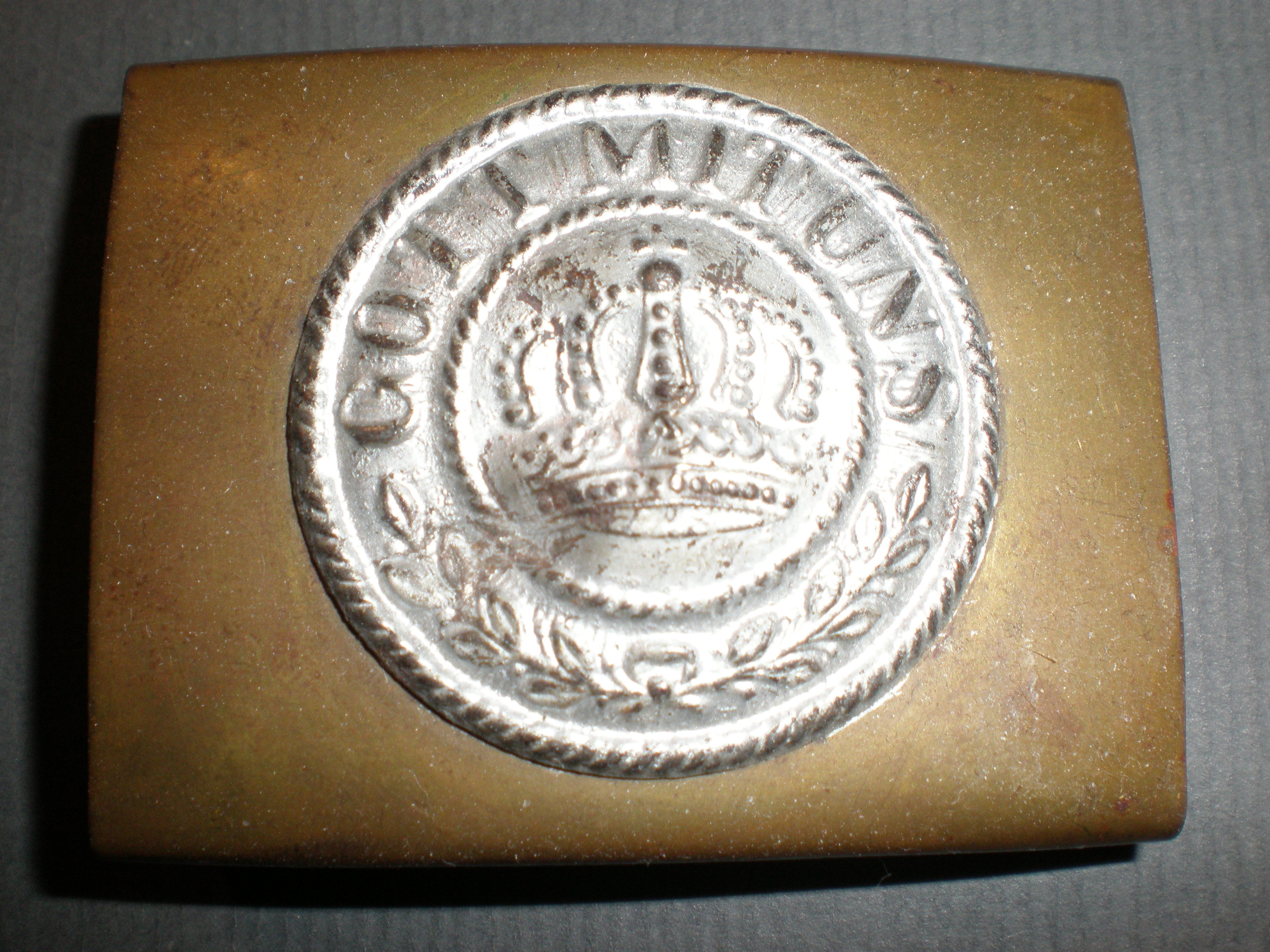
A belt buckle similar to the one given to Buckles by a German prisoner in 1918

Buckles saw the war's impact on malnourished children in France, and more than 80 years later he could remember helping to feed them. After the Armistice in 1918, Buckles escorted prisoners of war back to Germany. One German prisoner gave him a belt buckle inscribed "Gott mit uns" (English: God with us), which he kept for the rest of his life. Buckles was promoted to corporal on September 22, 1919. Following an honorable discharge in November 1919, he returned to the United States aboard USS Pocahontas.

Early in the interwar period, he attended the dedication of the Liberty Memorial in Kansas City, Missouri, in honor of the Americans who died in World War I, and met General of the Armies John Pershing, who commanded the American Expeditionary Forces in Europe during the war. Buckles then attended business school in Oklahoma City, and found work at a shipping company in Toronto, Ontario, Canada. From 1922 to 1923, he served with the Seventh Regiment of the New York National Guard in New York City where he also worked in financial services.

Next came a career as chief purser on cargo and passenger ships travelling to South America, Europe, and Asia. In the 1930s, German and British passengers expressed fears about the Nazis, and military officers told him that Germany was equipping for war. Buckles witnessed antisemitism and its effects firsthand while ashore in Germany, and he warned acquaintances in Germany that their country would be brought down by Adolf Hitler, whom he encountered at a German hotel. Employed at sea during the Great Depression, he forwarded an $800 Army bonus to his father who was struggling as a farmer in the Oklahoma Dust Bowl (Buckles provided these details many decades later).

== During and after World War II ==
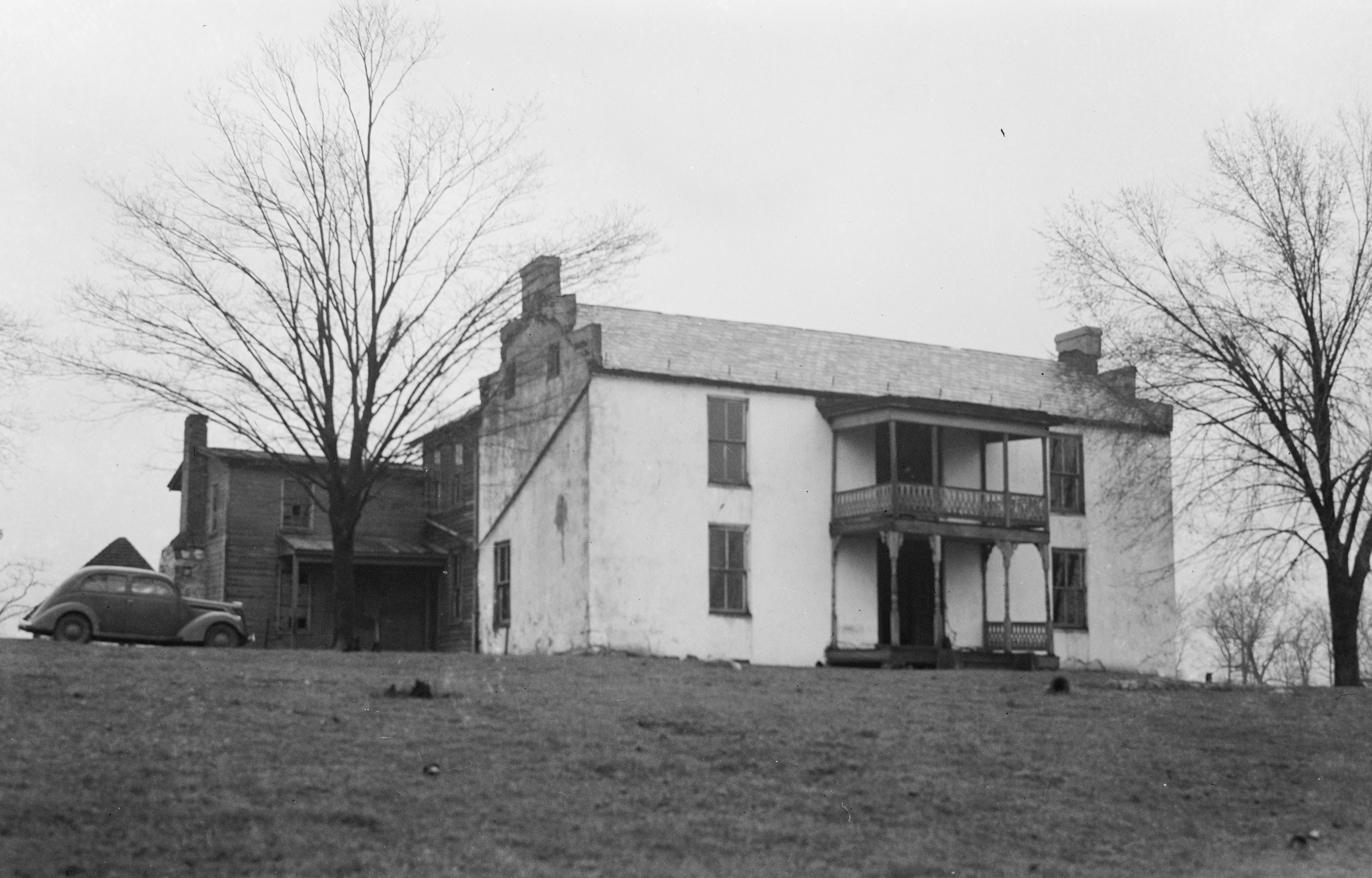
Buckles' future home, Gap View Farm, in the 1930s

As of 1940, Buckles had been employed by the White Star, American President, and W.R. Grace shipping companies, and in that year shipping business took him to Manila in the Philippines. After the outbreak of the Pacific War and the invasion of the Philippines, he reportedly remained in Manila to help resupply U.S. troops. He was captured in January 1942 by Japanese forces, and spent the next three years and two months as a civilian internee in the Santo Tomas and Los Baños prison camps.

As a prisoner, he battled starvation, receiving only a small meal of mush served in a tin cup—a utensil he kept for the rest of his life. With a weight below 100 pounds (45 kg), Buckles developed beriberi, and led fellow captives in calisthenics to counter the effects of imprisonment. Their captors showed little mercy, but Buckles was allowed to grow a small garden, which he often used to help feed children who were imprisoned there.

All of the captives were freed following a raid by Allied forces on February 23, 1945. Before the war he had become fluent in German, Spanish, Portuguese, and French, and by its end had learned some Japanese.

After World War II, Buckles moved to San Francisco and married Audrey Mayo in 1946. Eight years later, the couple bought the 330-acre (1.3 km^{2}) Gap View Farm in West Virginia where they raised cattle. Ancestors named Buckles had settled near Gap View Farm centuries earlier.

In 1955, their only child, Susannah, was born. By then, the world traveler had settled down to a life of farm activities, social events, and serving as an officer (eventually president) of the county historical society. Audrey Buckles died in 1999, and their daughter moved back to the farm to care for him.

== Active centenarian ==
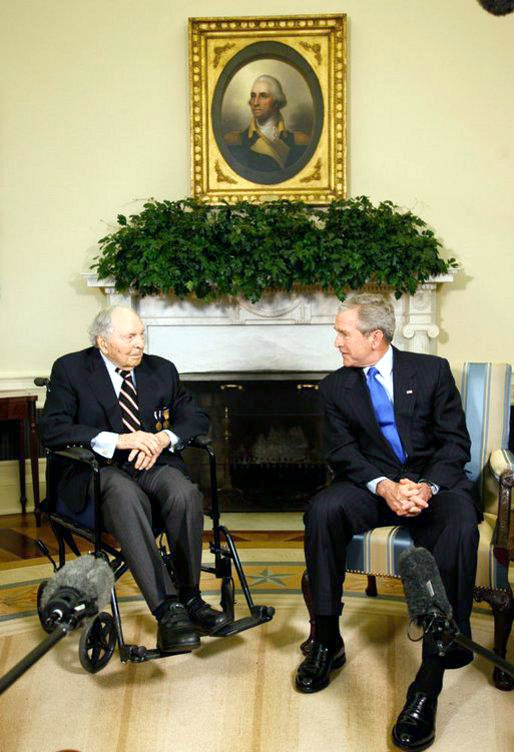
Buckles, aged 107 with George W. Bush in the Oval Office (2008)

After the start of the 21st century, Buckles continued living near Charles Town, West Virginia, and was still driving a tractor on his farm at age 103. He stated in an interview with The Washington Post on Veterans' Day 2007 that he believed the United States should not go to war "unless it's an emergency". He has also stated that, "If your country needs you, you should be right there, that is the way I felt when I was young, and that's the way I feel today."

When asked the secret of long life, Buckles replied that being hopeful and not hurrying were key traits, adding: "When you start to die ... don't". In another interview, the centenarian talked about genetics, exercise, and a healthy diet, but put "the will to survive" above everything else.

Buckles joined actor Gary Sinise in 2007 to lead a Memorial Day parade, and that evening his life was featured on NBC Nightly News. With the death of 108-year-old Harry Richard Landis in February 2008, Buckles became the last surviving American veteran of World War I. The following month, he met with United States President George W. Bush at the White House. The same day, he attended the opening of a Pentagon exhibit featuring photos of nine centenarian World War I veterans, with Defense Secretary Robert Gates in attendance. That summer, he visited wounded soldiers at Walter Reed Army Medical Center.

Buckles was the Honorary Chairman of the World War I Memorial Foundation, which seeks refurbishment of the District of Columbia War Memorial and its establishment as the National World War I Memorial on the National Mall. He was named ABC's World News Tonight's "Person of the Week" on March 22, 2009, in recognition of his efforts to set up the memorial. Those efforts continued, as Buckles appeared before Congress on December 3, 2009, advocating on behalf of such legislation. He did so as the oldest person who ever testified before Congress. On Armistice Day (i.e. Veterans Day) of 2010, he made a further appeal:

We still do not have a national memorial in Washington, D.C. to honor the Americans who sacrificed with their lives during World War I. On this eve of Veterans Day, I call upon the American people and the world to help me in asking our elected officials to pass the law for a memorial to World War I in our nation's capital. These are difficult times, and we are not asking for anything elaborate. What is fitting and right is a memorial that can take its place among those commemorating the other great conflicts of the past century. On this 92nd anniversary of the armistice, it is time to move forward with honor, gratitude, and resolve.

Passage of the legislation remained in doubt because opponents sought relocation of the proposed monument or, alternatively, some benefit for the District of Columbia. As of July 2013, U.S. Senator Pat Toomey was concerned that such a memorial would lead to the National Mall becoming "cluttered". Ultimately, the World War I Memorial was approved for a nearby site, and was opened in 2021.

A Freemason and longtime Shriner, Buckles was a member of the Osiris Shriners of Wheeling, West Virginia, and he became "the oldest Shriner in Shrinedom". Other interests of his included genealogy; he had been a member of the West Virginia Society of the Sons of the American Revolution since 1935, and was active for many years in the Sons of Confederate Veterans. He was a Life Member of the National Rifle Association of America.

On February 1, 2010—Buckles' 109th birthday—his official biographer, David DeJonge, announced a forthcoming documentary about him, titled Pershing's Last Patriot, described as a cumulative work of interviews and vignettes. DeJonge estimated a 2011 release for the documentary, and actor Richard Thomas was expected to narrate the film.

In late 2010, Buckles was still giving media interviews and became a supercentenarian upon his 110th birthday, on February 1, 2011.

On February 27, 2011, Buckles died of natural causes at his home aged 110 years and 26 days. He was the second-oldest living man in the United States at the time of his death (114-year-old American man Walter Breuning, born in September 1896, died 46 days after Buckles).

== Commemoration and funeral ==
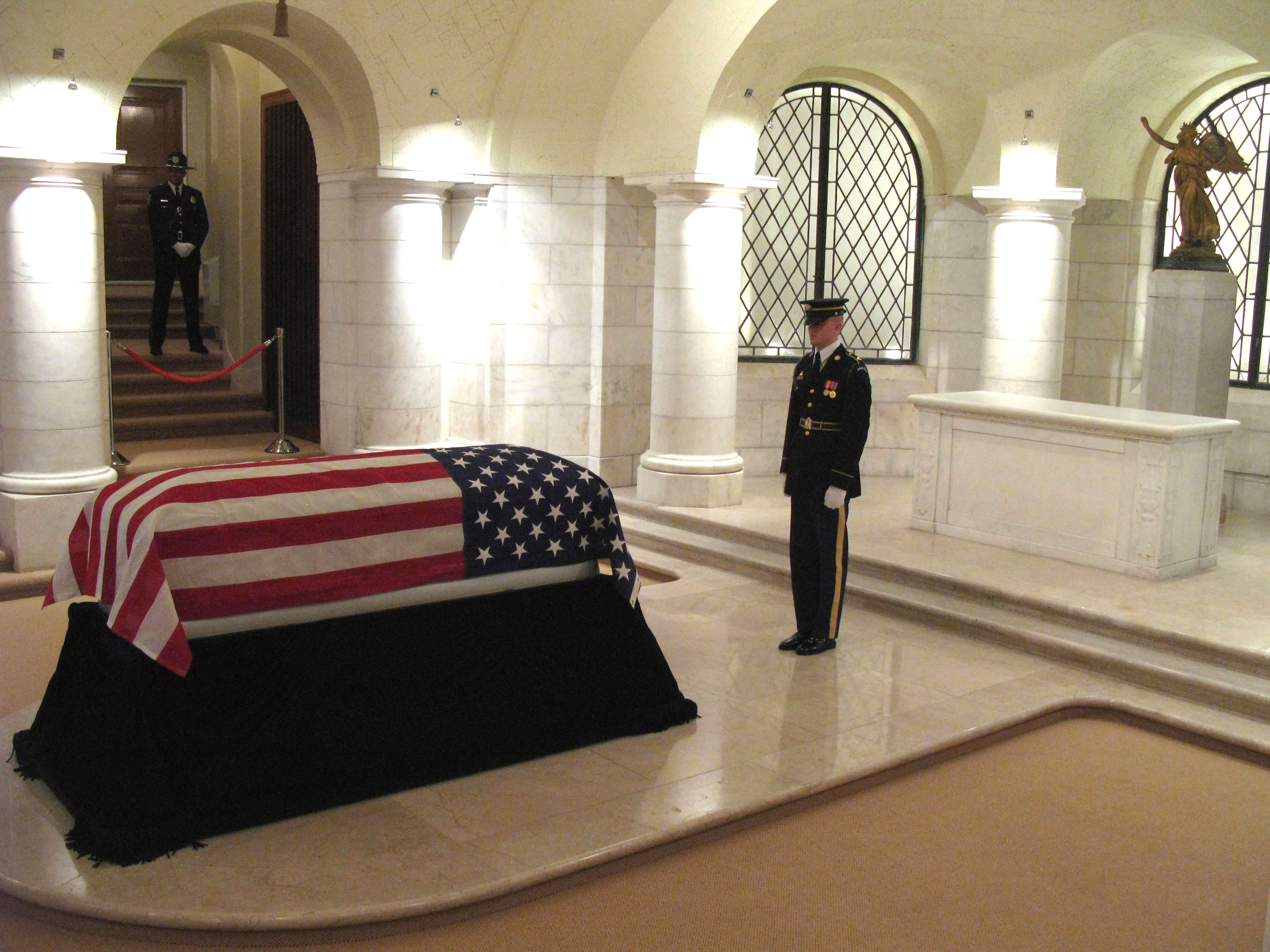
Lying in honor at Arlington National Cemetery, guarded by a 3rd Infantry Regiment soldier

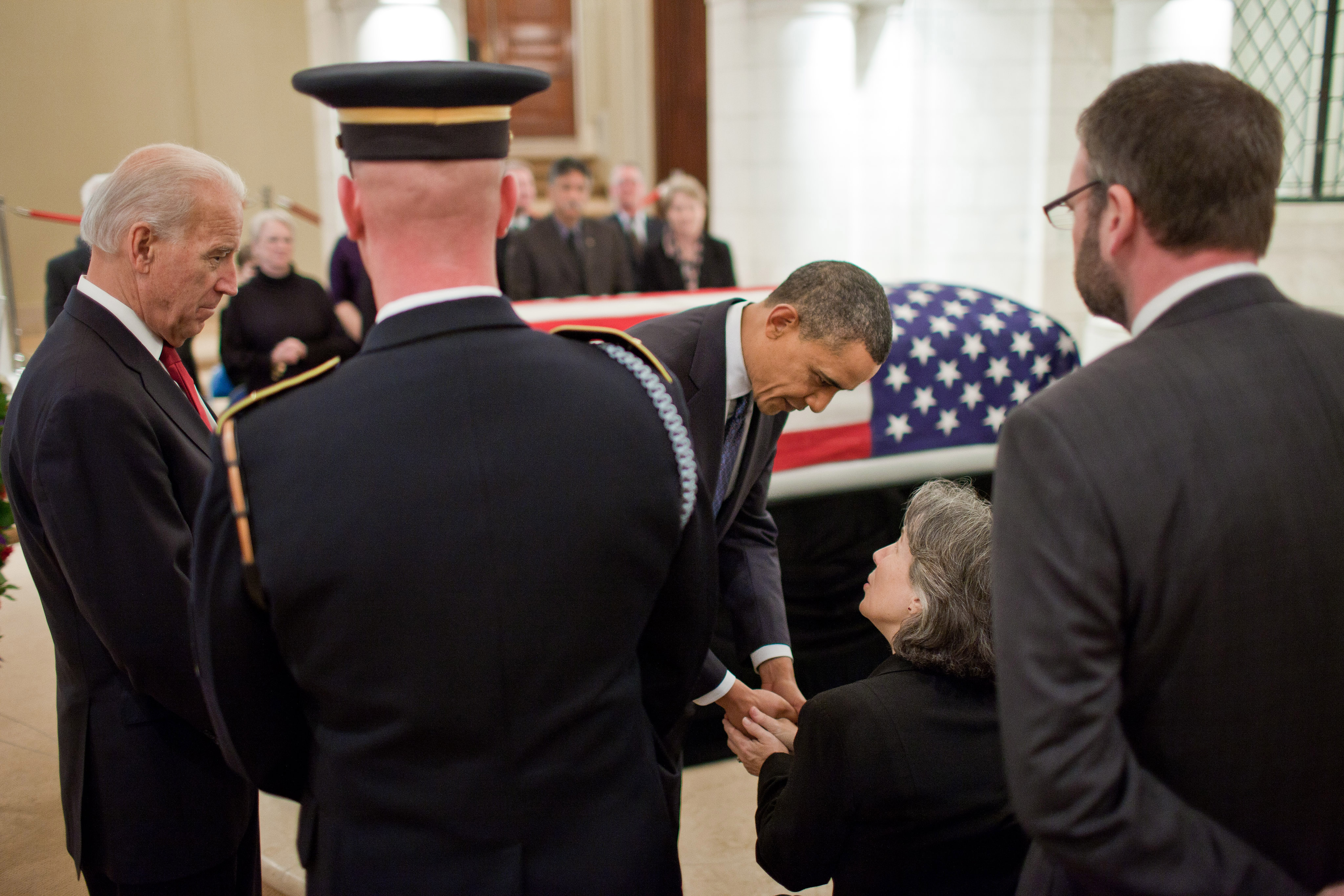
US President Barack Obama and Vice President Joe Biden pay respects to Buckles' family

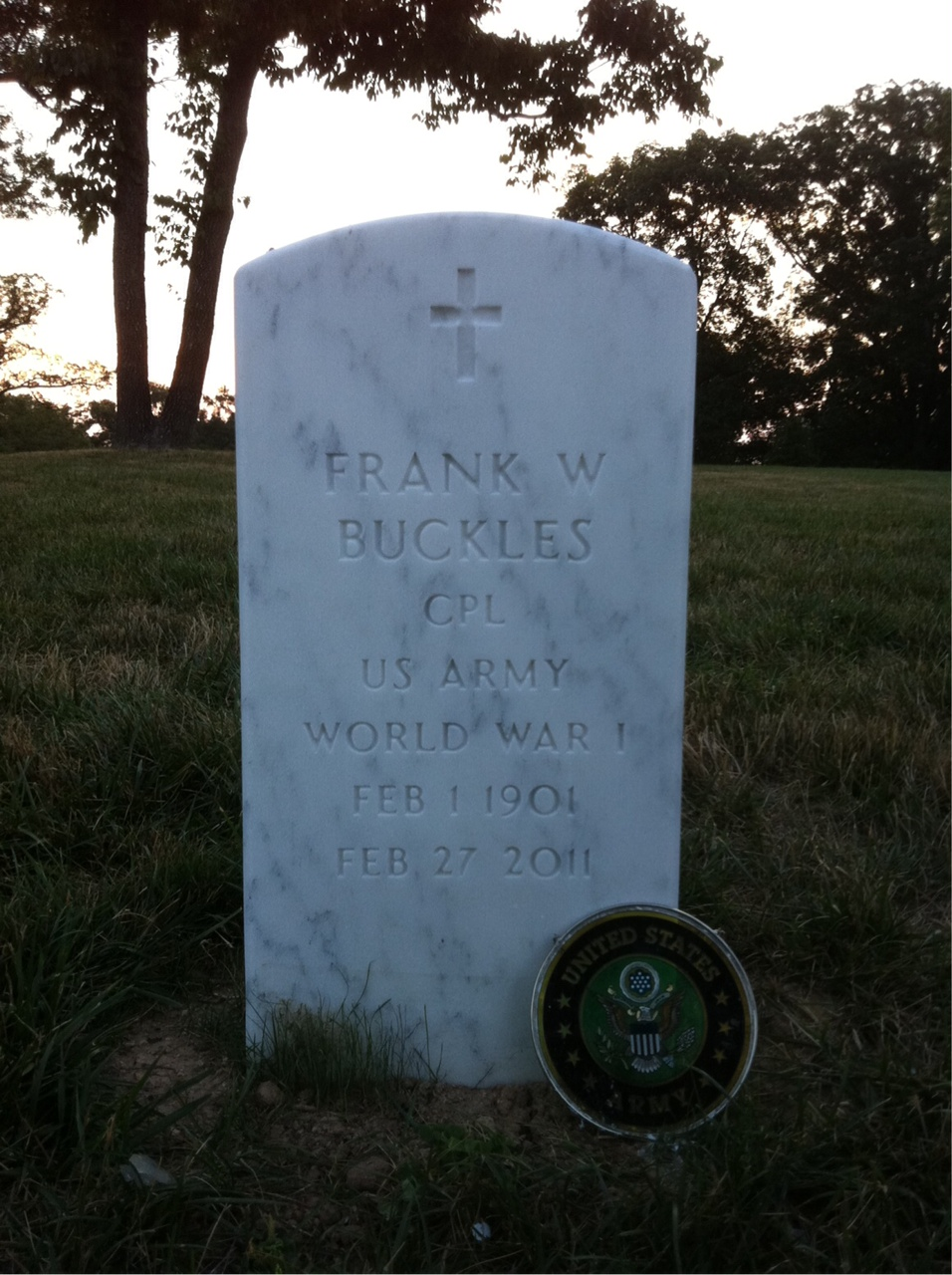
Buckles' Arlington grave marker

Buckles did not meet the criteria for burial at Arlington National Cemetery as he had never been in combat, but friends and family secured special permission from the federal government in 2008. That was accomplished with the help of Ross Perot, who had met him at a history seminar in 2001, and who intervened in 2008 with the White House regarding a final resting place.

Upon Buckles' death on February 27, 2011, President Barack Obama ordered that the American flag be flown at half-staff on all government buildings, including the White House and U.S. embassies, on the day in March when Buckles would be buried at Arlington. Leading up to the March 15 funeral, the governors of 16 states likewise called for lowering their states' flags to half-staff. (Note: The state governors issuing proclamations were West Virginia acting-Governor Earl Ray Tomblin, Missouri Governor Jay Nixon, Pennsylvania Governor Tom Corbett, North Carolina Governor Bev Perdue, Nebraska Governor Dave Heineman, North Dakota Governor Jack Dalrymple, Maine Governor Paul LePage, Iowa Governor Terry Branstad, Hawaii Governor Neil Abercrombie, Maryland Governor Martin O'Malley, Connecticut Governor Dan Malloy, Kansas Governor Sam Brownback, Alaska Governor Sean Parnell, Ohio Governor John Kasich, South Dakota Governor Dennis Daugaard, and Nevada Governor Brian Sandoval.)

The United States Senate passed a resolution on March 3, 2011, honoring "the last veteran to represent the extraordinary legacy of the World War I veterans". Concurrent resolutions were proposed in both the Senate and the House of Representatives for Buckles to lie in honor in the United States Capitol rotunda. However, that plan was blocked by Speaker of the House John Boehner and Senate Majority Leader Harry Reid. When asked for explanation, their spokesmen would not elaborate on reasons for the decision. Boehner and Reid instead advocated a ceremony in the Amphitheater of Arlington National Cemetery. Various people had supported a rotunda ceremony, including Buckles' daughter, a great-grandson of Sir Winston Churchill, and former Republican Party presidential nominee Bob Dole.

Faculty and students at Buckles' high school in Missouri gathered to honor him on March 8, 2011. His home church in Charles Town held a memorial service, attended by the Episcopal bishop of West Virginia, members of Buckles' family and others. On March 12, 2011, a ceremony was held at the Liberty Memorial in Kansas City, Missouri, to honor Buckles and the "passing of the Great War generation". The keynote speaker was former Chairman of the Joint Chiefs of Staff Richard Myers.

A ceremony at Arlington National Cemetery's Memorial Amphitheater Chapel preceded the interment on March 15. During the ceremony prior to burial, President Barack Obama and Vice President Joe Biden paid their respects and met with the family.

Buckles' flag-draped coffin was borne to the burial plot on a horse-drawn caisson, and the folded flag was handed to his daughter by United States Army Vice Chief of Staff General Peter W. Chiarelli. Buckles was buried with full military honors in Section 34, near General of the Armies John J. Pershing. Reporter Paul Duggan of The Washington Post summed up the occasion:

The hallowed ritual at grave No. 34-581 was not a farewell to one man alone. A reverent crowd of the powerful and the ordinary—President Obama and Vice President Biden, laborers and store clerks, heads bowed—came to salute Buckles's deceased generation, the vanished millions of soldiers and sailors he came to symbolize in the end.

In Martinsburg, West Virginia, on March 26, 2011, a candlelight vigil was held in memory of Buckles. Attendees made donations for a planned statue of him in Charles Town.

In addition to being the last U.S. veteran of World War I, Buckles was the oldest World War I veteran in the world at the time of his death, as well as the last field veteran of the war. Following his death and funeral, there were two surviving World War I veterans, British-born Florence Green and British Australian citizen Claude Choules, both of whom served in the British Armed Forces. Choules died on May 5, 2011; Green died on February 4, 2012.

== Honors ==
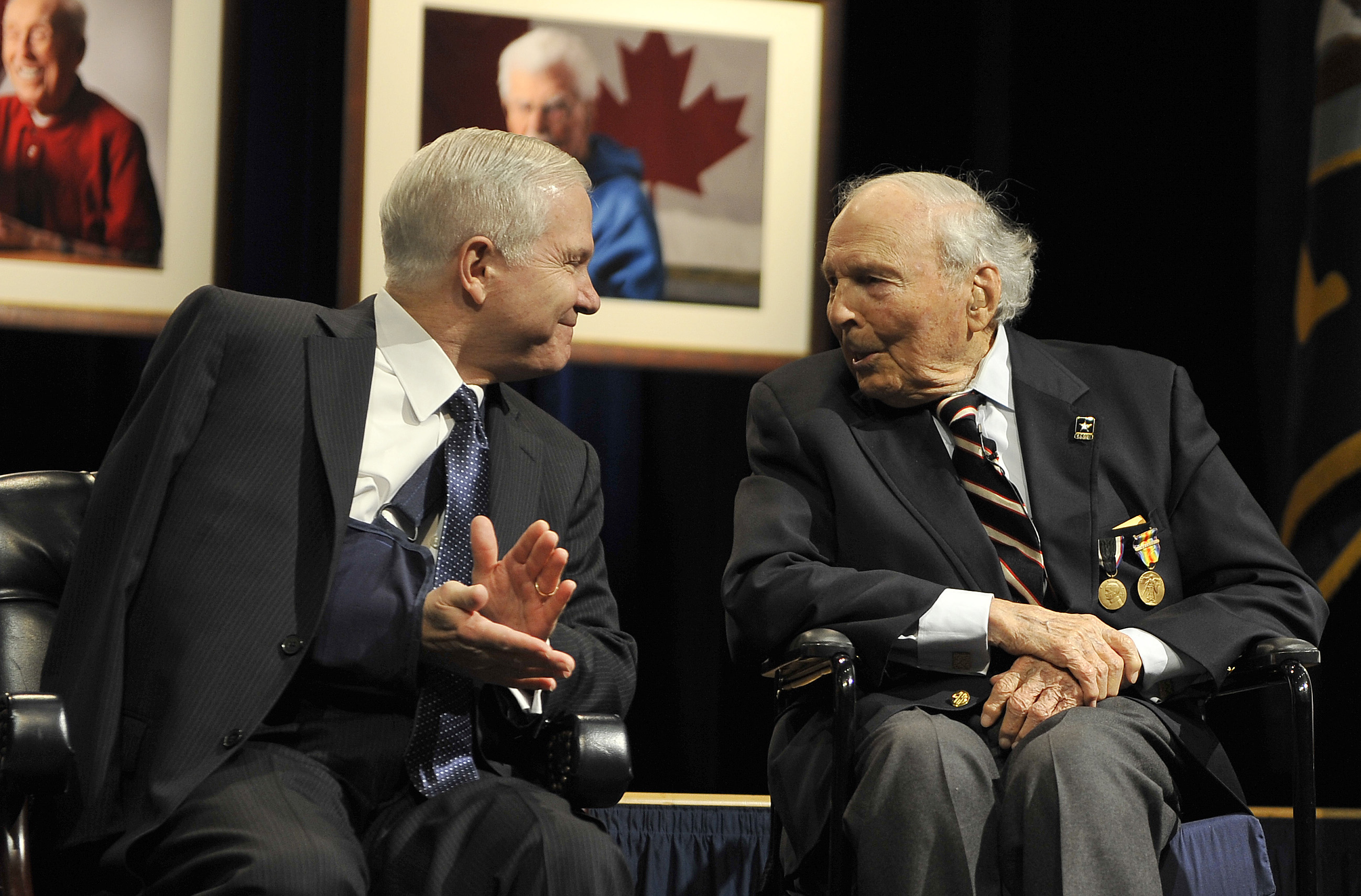
Above: With Defense Secretary Robert Gates in 2008
Below: Buckles' U.S. Army and French Legion of Honour ribbons

For his service during World War I, Buckles received, from the United States government, the World War I Victory Medal and four Overseas Service Bars. He also qualified for the Army of Occupation of Germany Medal due to his postwar service in Europe during the year 1919, and received that medal after it was created in 1941. Buckles was ineligible for the Prisoner of War Medal since he was a civilian while taken prisoner by the Japanese during World War II.

As a resident of Jefferson County, West Virginia, he was involved for many years with the Jefferson County Historical Society (including as president from 1960 to 1964). In 1981, he was named Emeritus Officer by that organization.

In 1999, French president Jacques Chirac awarded him France's Legion of Honour, for his service during World War I.

In 2007, the United States Library of Congress included Buckles in its Veterans History Project (VHP). He conducted three oral history interviews, given when he was 100, 103, and 107 years old. Information about Buckles' experiences in both world wars is available from the VHP, including a 148-minute video interview.

In 2008, a section of West Virginia Route 9, which passes by his Gap View Farm home, was named in his honor by West Virginia Governor Joe Manchin. The following month, Buckles received the Veterans of Foreign Wars' Gold Medal of Merit at the Liberty Memorial. Also in 2008, he sat for a portrait to be displayed at the National World War I Museum. Buckles received the Scottish Rite of Freemasonry's Knight Commander of the Court of Honour (KCCH) in September 2008.

In April 2021, Buckles's wish to have a memorial for World War I veterans in Washington, D.C., became true. On April 16, 2021, the memorial was officially inaugurated with a flag-raising ceremony as well as military fly-over and remarks from President Joe Biden. It was hosted by actor Gary Sinise.

== See also ==
- List of last surviving World War I veterans
- List of ambulance drivers during World War I
- Last surviving United States war veterans
