= Harry Richard Landis =

American World War I veteran (1899-2008)

Harry R. Landis
- Born: December 12, 1899; Miller Township, Missouri, U.S.
- Died: February 4, 2008 (aged 108); Sun City Center, Florida, U.S.
- Relatives: Eleanor M. Landis (spouse)
- Military career
- Allegiance: United States
- Branch: United States Army
- Service years: October 1918 – December 1918
- Conflicts: World War I

Harry Richard Landis (12 December 1899 – 4 February 2008) was, at age 108, the older of the last two American First World War veterans. The final one was Frank Buckles, who died in 2011. John Babcock, a naturalized American, served in the Canadian Army during the war, and also survived Landis.

== Biography ==
Landis was born to Jason and Alice Landis in Miller Township, Marion County, Missouri, between Hannibal and Palmyra, where he grew up on the family farm. He was the seventh of eight children.

Landis joined the United States Army in October 1918, and joined the Student Army Training Corps while attending Central Methodist University in Missouri. He did not complete basic training due to the war ending less than a month later. His experience of mopping the floor at an army hospital included exposure to the Spanish flu, which was actually the leading cause of death worldwide in the year 1918, killing about 75 million people. Landis was discharged in December 1918, one month after the signing of the Treaty of Versailles.

Attempting to try to enlist in World War II after the Attack on Pearl Harbor in 1941, he was rejected as "too old". Landis retired in 1959 after working at the S.S. Kresge Corporation for many years in management roles.

Landis was married twice, first for 46 years to Eunice who predeceased him. He remarried in 1978 to his second wife Eleanor. They moved to Florida in 1988, after previously living in Niagara Falls, NY and Dayton, OH.

He and his wife Eleanor, both died at Sun City Center in 2008. Harry died on 4 February, and Eleanor on 8 December aged 101.
