= Robert Masterson House =

Historic house in Missouri, United States

- U.S. National Register of Historic Places
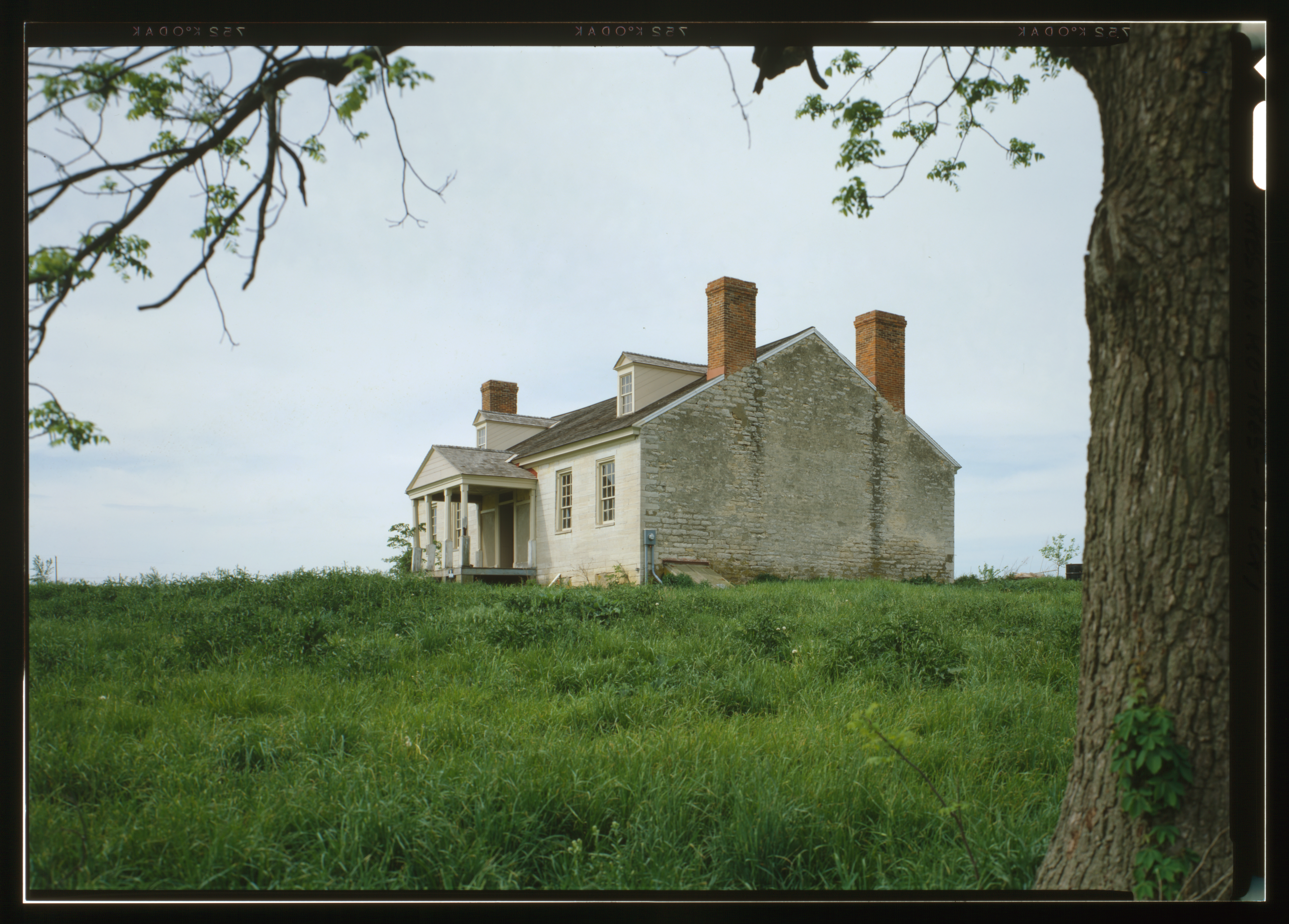
- The Robert Masterson House in about 1983

- Location within Missouri Location within the United States
- Location: Northwest of Hannibal, near Hannibal, Missouri
- Coordinates: 39°46′2″N 91°28′20″W
- Area: 3 acres (1.2 ha)
- Built: 1820
- Architectural style: Georgian
- NRHP reference No.: 84002591
- Added to NRHP: April 5, 1984

The Robert Masterson House is located in Marion County, Missouri and was built prior to 1826 by Robert Masterson. It is listed on the National Register of Historic Places.

== Structure ==
The Robert Masterson House is a significant regional example of an early Georgian cottage floor plan rare in Missouri. The house is constructed of native limestone and faces roughly East from a rolling upland near an ever-flowing spring. It is located some three miles west of the Mississippi River bottom and five miles northwest of Hannibal, Missouri, several miles southeast of Palmyra, Missouri. Most of the original structure and interior woodwork still exist. The dwelling is two rooms deep and consists of a file of two rooms on either side of a central hallway, with four small attic rooms separated by a hall above. Robert Masterson (1791–1864), a veteran of the War of 1812 and the builder of the house, played an important role in the early settlement of the area. The Masterson house is the oldest surviving dwelling in Marion County and possibly the oldest in Northeast Missouri.

== Ownership ==
The Robert Masterson House was restored in the 1990s and is currently privately owned.
