= Dryden-Louthan House =

Historic house in Missouri, United States

- U.S. National Register of Historic Places
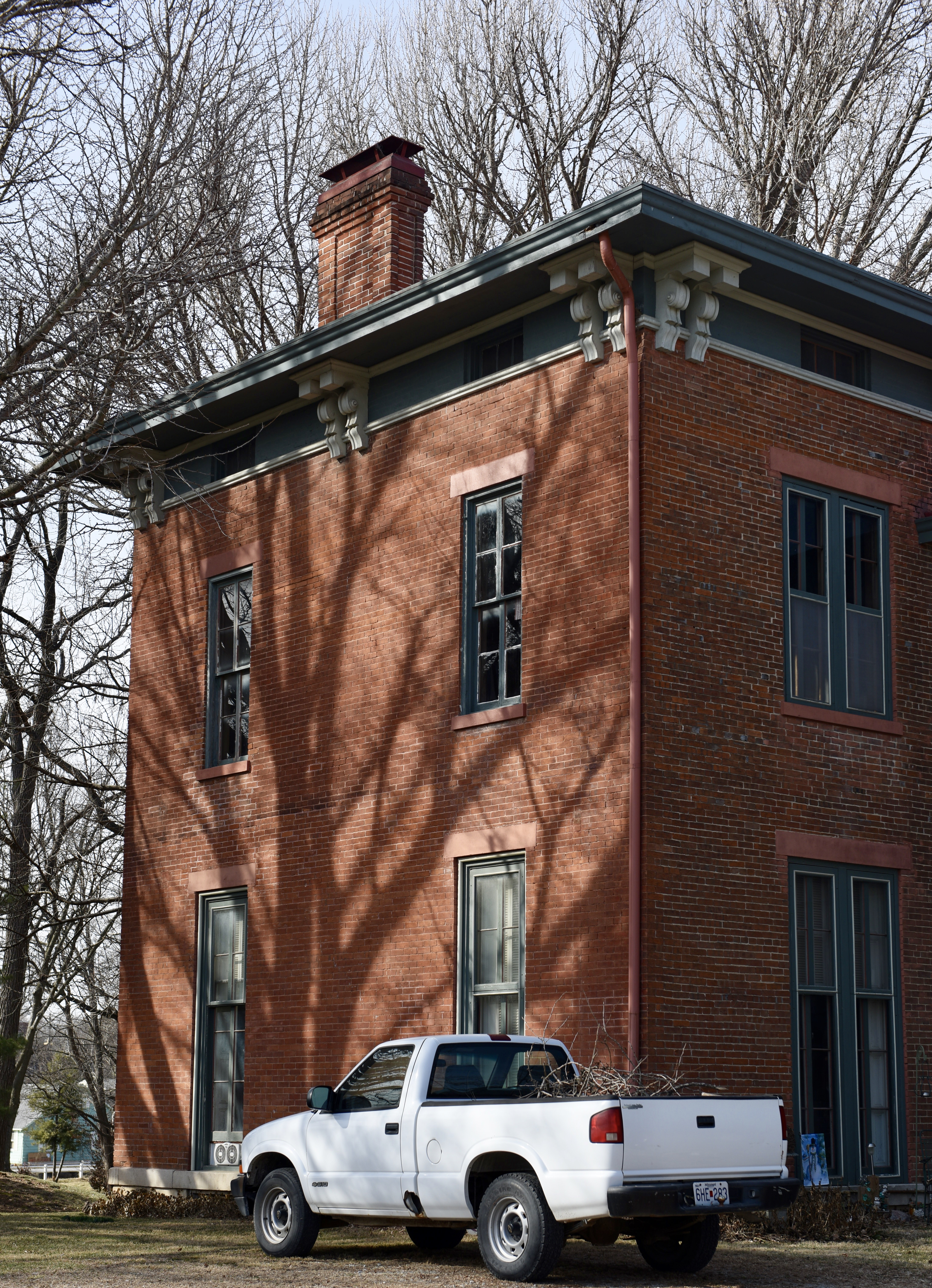

- Location within Missouri Location within the United States
- Location: 402 E. Ross St. Palmyra, Missouri
- Coordinates: 39°47′40″N 91°31′9″W
- Area: 0.7 acres (0.28 ha)
- Built: 1858
- Architectural style: Italianate
- NRHP reference No.: 85000104
- Added to NRHP: January 18, 1985

Dryden-Louthan House is a historic home located at Palmyra, Marion County, Missouri. It was built in 1858, and is a two-story, Italianate style burnt-sienna-colored brick dwelling. It has low hipped roofs and cornices ornamented by paired, elaborately scrolled brackets.

It was added to the National Register of Historic Places in 1985.
