= Hannibal Lime Company Office =

- U.S. National Register of Historic Places
- Location within Missouri Location within the United States
- Location: 623 Collier St., Hannibal, Missouri
- Coordinates: 39°42′18″N 91°21′34″W
- Area: 0.1 acres (0.040 ha)
- Built: c. 1880
- NRHP reference No.: 84002585
- Added to NRHP: September 6, 1984

Hannibal Lime Company Office is a historic commercial building located at Hannibal, Marion County, Missouri. It was built about 1880, and is a two-story red brick structure, three bays wide and six deep. It has a rubble foundation, tall segmental arched openings, and hipped roof with front gable.

It was added to the National Register of Historic Places in 1984.
