= Walker-Woodward-Schaffer House =

Historic house in Missouri, United States

- U.S. National Register of Historic Places
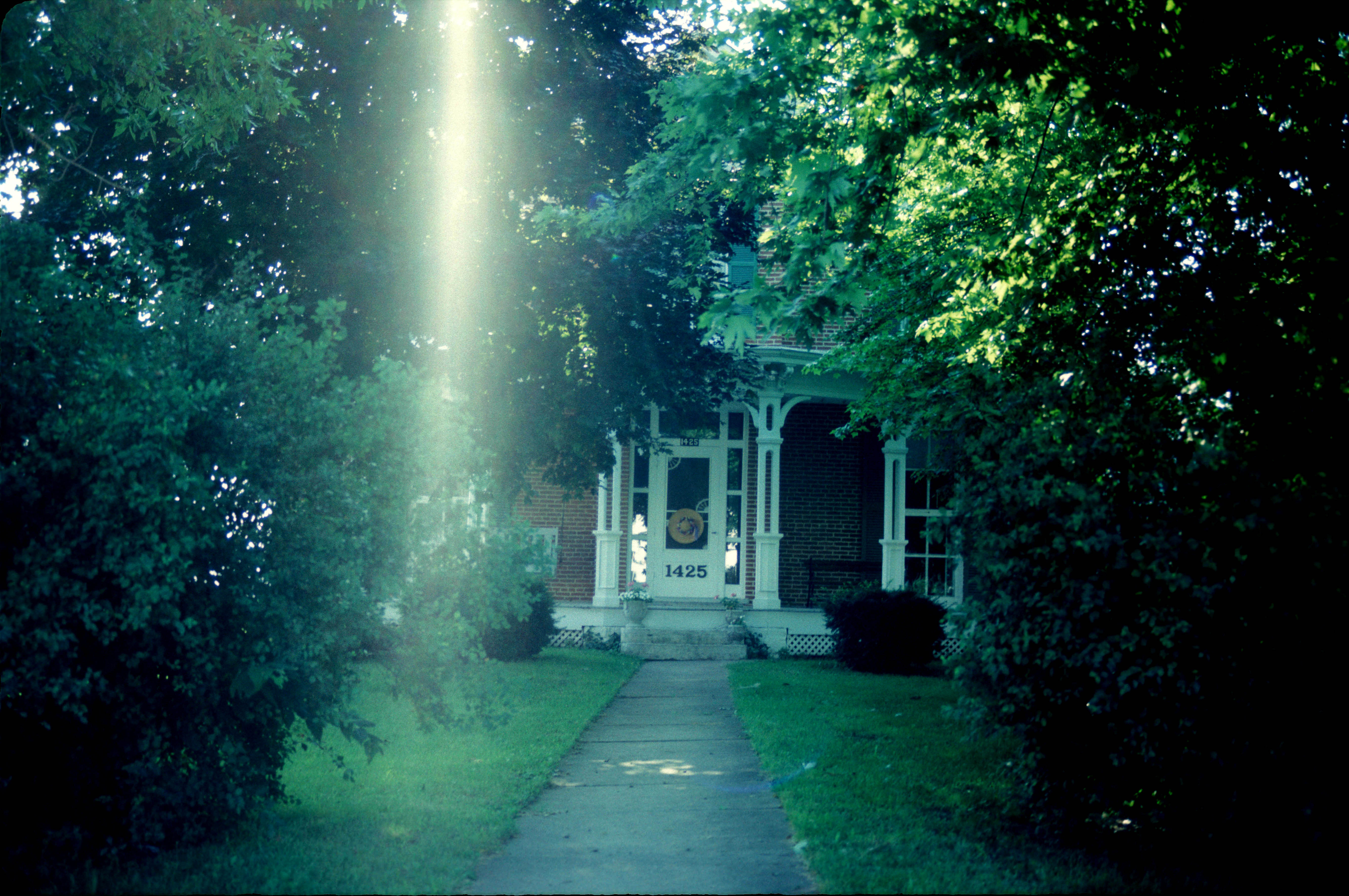
- Walker-Woodward-Schaffer House, January 2007

- Location within Missouri Location within the United States
- Location: 1425 S. Main St., Palmyra, Missouri
- Coordinates: 39°47′13″N 91°31′23″W
- Area: 0.4 acres (0.16 ha)
- Built: 1868
- Architectural style: Italianate
- NRHP reference No.: 84002592
- Added to NRHP: February 16, 1984

Walker-Woodward-Schaffer House, also known as the Jane Darwell Birthplace, is a historic home located at Palmyra, Marion County, Missouri. It was built about 1868, and is a two-story, three-bay, Italianate style brick dwelling. It has a two-story rear wing with a two-story gallery porch. Both sections have hipped roofs with bracketed cornices. A verandah spans the front of the house. It was the birthplace of actress Jane Darwell.

It was added to the National Register of Historic Places in 1984.
