= Green Double House =

Historic house in Missouri, United States

- U.S. National Register of Historic Places
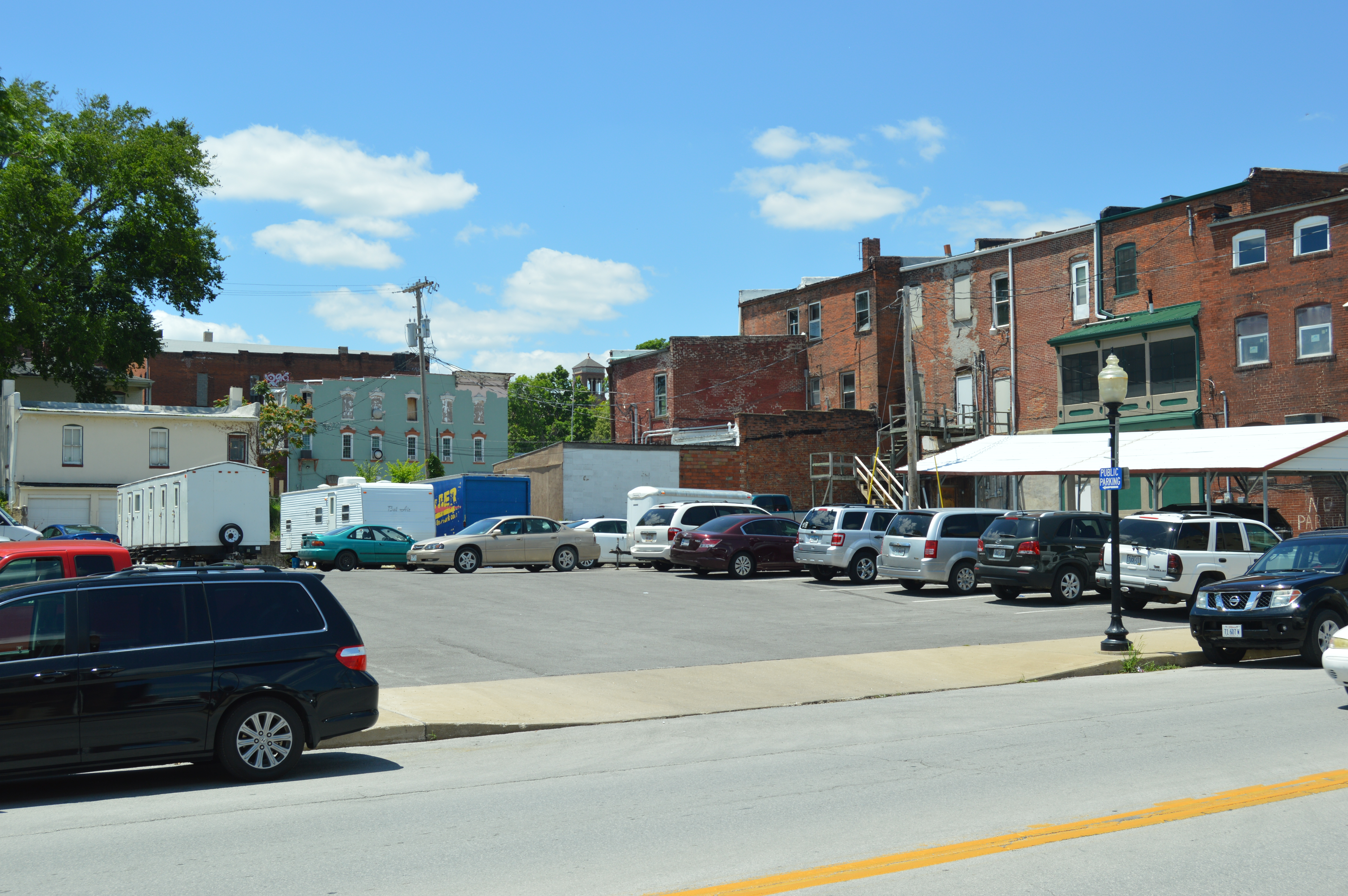
- Green Double House site, July 2014

- Location within Missouri Location within the United States
- Location: 113-115 S. Third St., Hannibal, Missouri
- Coordinates: 39°42′31″N 91°21′23″W
- Area: 0.1 acres (0.040 ha)
- Built: 1857-1858
- Built by: Green, Moses P.
- Architectural style: Raised Cottage
- MPS: Hannibal Central Business District MRA
- NRHP reference No.: 86002133
- Added to NRHP: August 1, 1986

Green Double House is a historic duplex home located at Hannibal, Marion County, Missouri. It was built in 1857–1858, and was a one-story, "raised cottage" or the "double gallery" clapboard structure on a completely exposed squared rubble basement. The house was divided into two residences. It has been demolished.

It was added to the National Register of Historic Places in 1986.
