= Levi Barkley House =

Historic house in Missouri, United States

- U.S. National Register of Historic Places
- Location within Missouri Location within the United States
- Location: West of Hannibal, near Hannibal, Missouri
- Coordinates: 39°44′04″N 91°29′51″W
- Area: 2.7 acres (1.1 ha)
- Built: 1860
- Architectural style: Greek Revival
- NRHP reference No.: 84002583
- Added to NRHP: March 2, 1984

Levi Barkley House, also known as the Barkley, Baxter, Landis House, is a historic home located near Hannibal, Marion County, Missouri. It was built about 1860, and is a two-story, vernacular Greek Revival style brick dwelling with a two-story rear ell. It has a double-pile, central hall, plan and sits on a stone foundation. It originally had a two-story front portico and rear gallery, later reduced to one story.

It was added to the National Register of Historic Places in 1984.
