= Robert Elliott's Wholesale Grocery =

- U.S. National Register of Historic Places
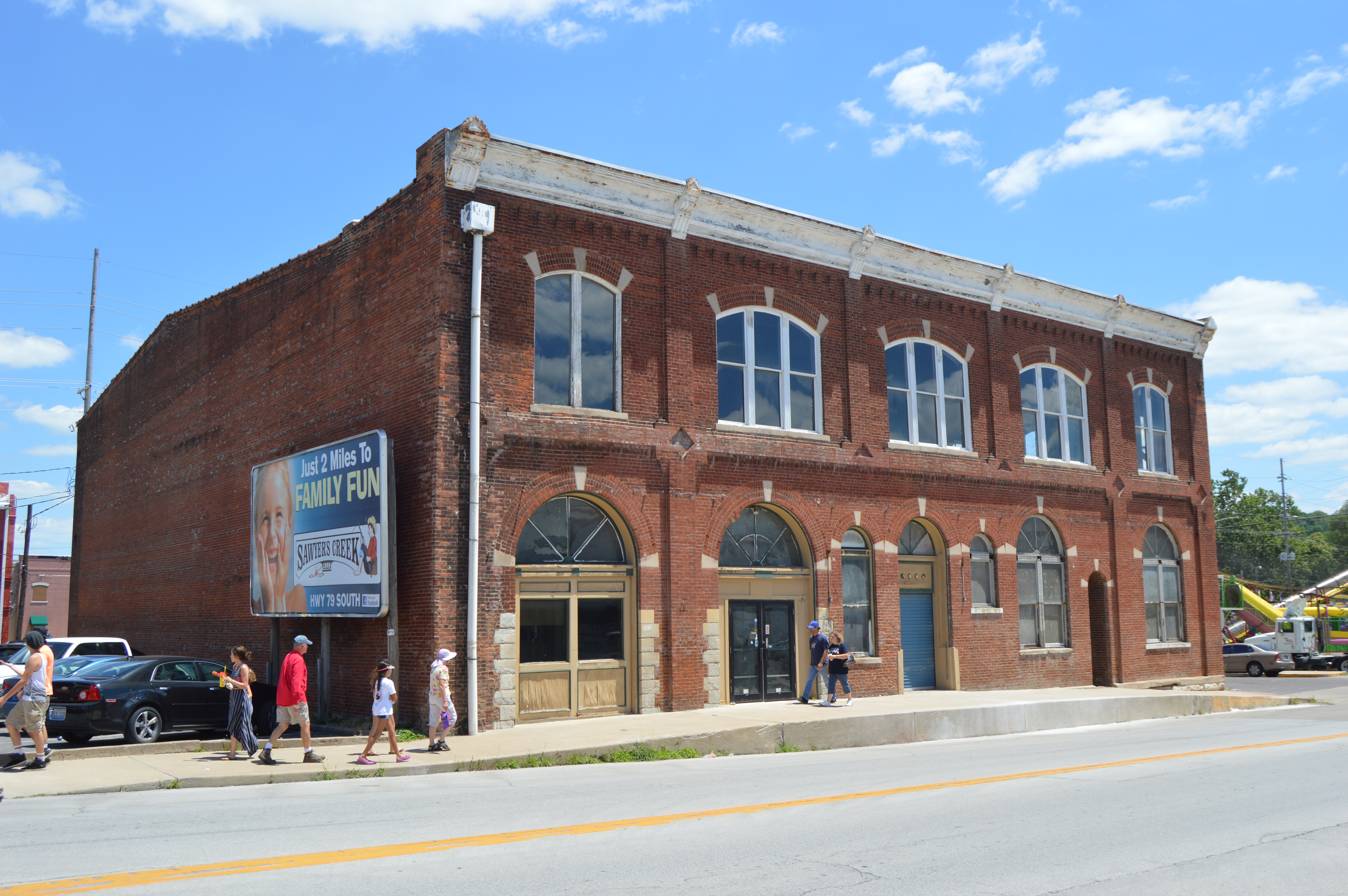
- Robert Elliott's Wholesale Grocery, July 2014

- Location within Missouri Location within the United States
- Location: 116--120 S. Third St., Hannibal, Missouri
- Coordinates: 39°42′31″N 91°21′22″W
- Area: 0.3 acres (0.12 ha)
- Built: c. 1886
- MPS: Hannibal Central Business District MRA
- NRHP reference No.: 86002132
- Added to NRHP: August 1, 1986

Robert Elliott's Wholesale Grocery is a historic commercial building located at Hannibal, Marion County, Missouri. It was built about 1886, and is a two-story brick structure. It features semicircular arches with fanlight tops on the first floor, upper windows with segmental arches, and an applied cornice, possibly metal.

It was added to the National Register of Historic Places in 1986.
