= Buildings at 207–209 South Main St. =

- U.S. National Register of Historic Places
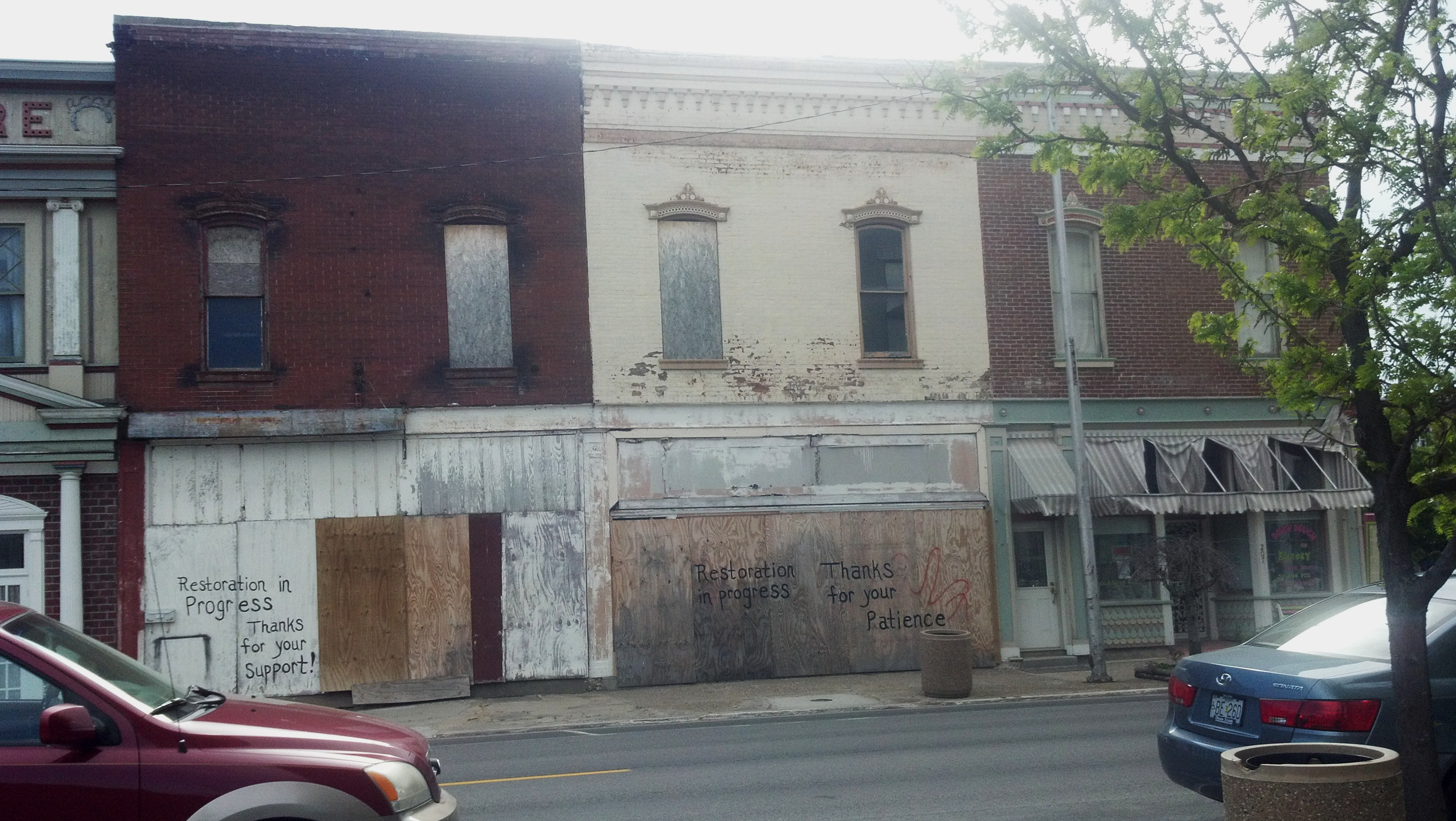
- September 2014

- Location within Missouri Location within the United States
- Location: 207–209 S. Main St., Hannibal, Missouri
- Coordinates: 39°42′30″N 91°21′17″W
- Area: 0.1 acres (0.040 ha)
- Built: 1860
- Architectural style: Early Commercial
- MPS: Hannibal Central Business District MRA
- NRHP reference No.: 86002129
- Added to NRHP: August 1, 1986

The buildings at 207–209 South Main St. are two historic commercial buildings located at Hannibal, Marion County, Missouri. They were built about 1860 and are two two-bay, two-story brick storefront buildings. They have high transom or fascia areas and segmental arched windows on the second story.

It was added to the National Register of Historic Places in 1986.
