= Hafner Grocery Warehouse =

- U.S. National Register of Historic Places
- Location within Missouri Location within the United States
- Location: 101 E. Church St., Hannibal, Missouri
- Coordinates: 39°42′34″N 91°21′12″W
- Area: 0.2 acres (0.081 ha)
- Built: c. 1910
- Architectural style: Warehouse
- MPS: Hannibal Central Business District MRA
- NRHP reference No.: 86002134
- Added to NRHP: August 1, 1986

Hafner Grocery Warehouse is a historic commercial warehouse located at Hannibal, Marion County, Missouri. It was built about 1910, and is a three-story brick structure on a concrete foundation. It features seven bays of segmental-arched windows and a corbelled parapet.

It was added to the National Register of Historic Places in 1986.
