= Peter J. Sowers House =

Historic house in Missouri, United States

- U.S. National Register of Historic Places
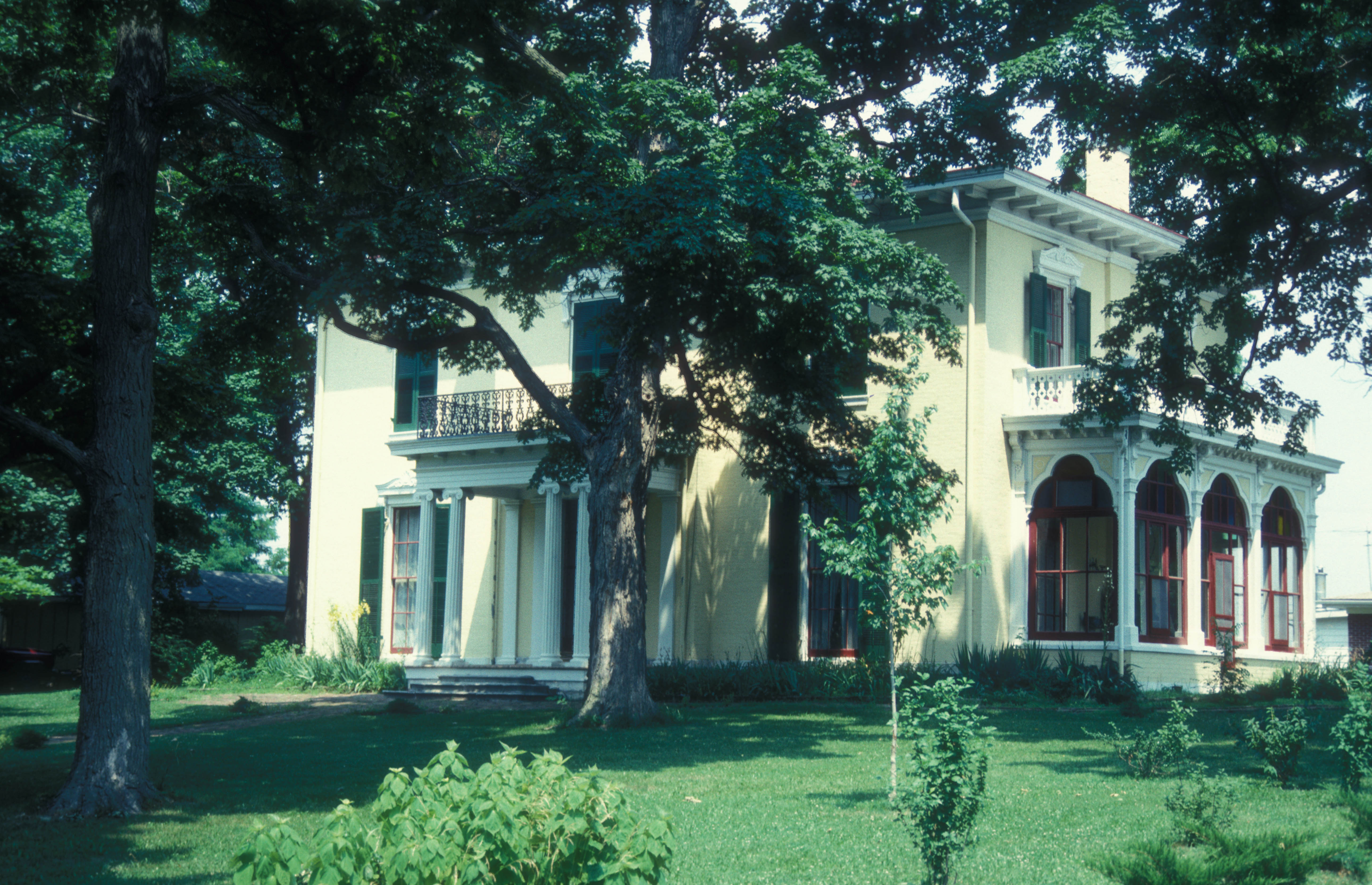
- Peter J. Sowers House, January 2007

- Location within Missouri Location within the United States
- Location: 221 Home St., Palmyra, Missouri
- Coordinates: 39°47′52″N 91°31′12″W
- Area: less than one acre
- Built: 1855
- Architectural style: Greek Revival, Italianate
- NRHP reference No.: 85000105
- Added to NRHP: January 18, 1985

Peter J. Sowers House is a historic home located at Palmyra, Marion County, Missouri. It was built in 1855, and is a two-story, transitional Greek Revival / Italianate style painted brick dwelling. It has a small rear wing and conservatory added in the 1870s. It has low hipped roofs with modillioned cornices and a stone foundation.

It was added to the National Register of Historic Places in 1985.
