= Riverview Park (Hannibal, Missouri) =

- U.S. National Register of Historic Places
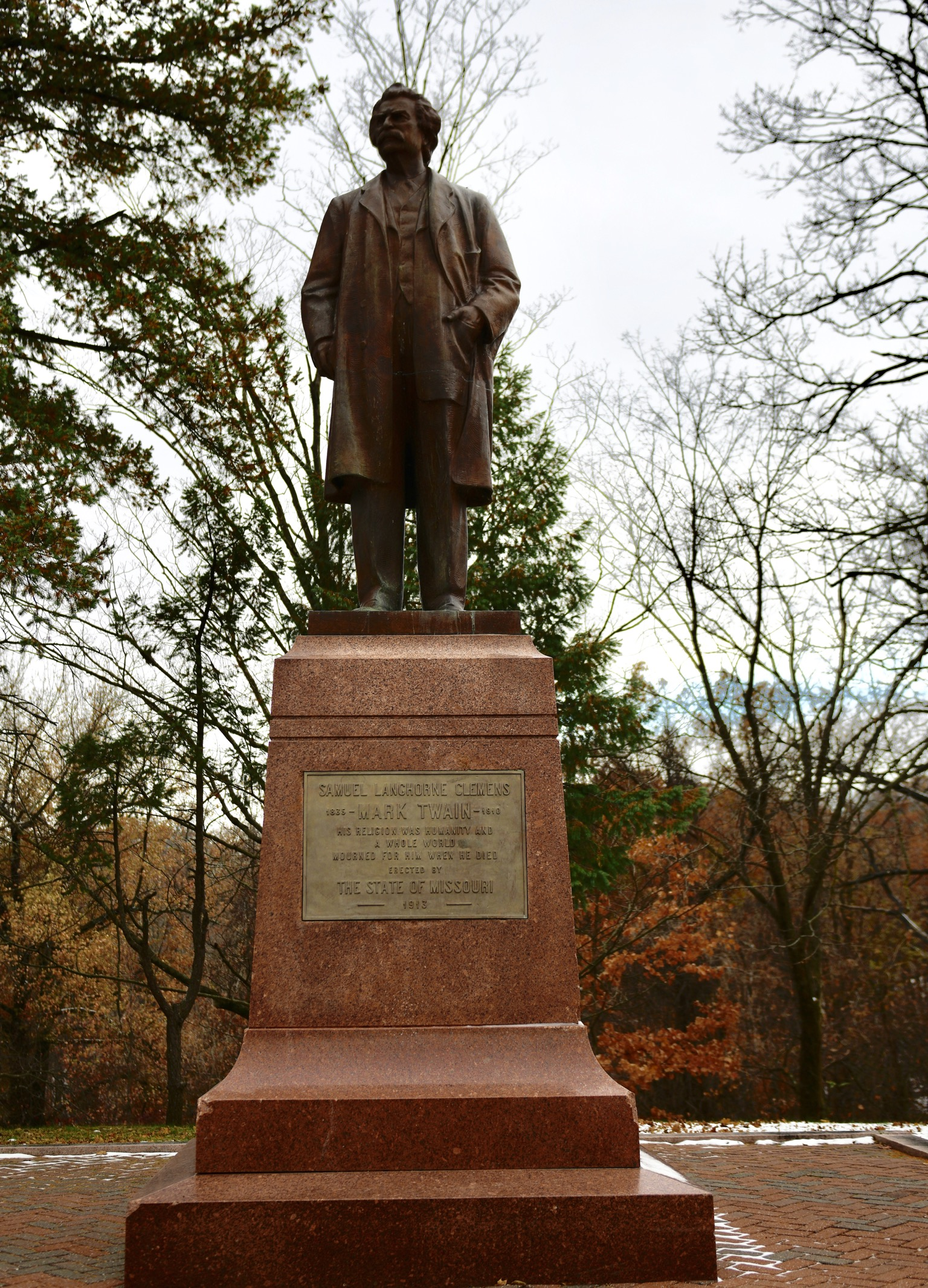

- Location within Missouri Location within the United States
- Location: 2000 Harrison Hill; Hannibal, Missouri
- Coordinates: 39°43′29″N 91°22′18″W
- Area: 465 acres (188 ha)
- Built: 1909
- Architect: Simonds, Ossian Cole; Simonds and West
- Architectural style: Prairie Style Landscape
- NRHP reference No.: 05000998
- Added to NRHP: September 6, 2005

Riverview Park is a historic prairie style public park located at Hannibal, Marion County, Missouri. It was established in 1909, and built through 1929 according to plans developed by noted landscape architect Ossian C. Simonds. The park includes the caretaker's house (1880s), three scenic overlooks with retaining walls, the concrete stairway, the driving path, the logging road, the statue of Mark Twain (1913), and the memorial stone and plaque. The park encircles the 17 acres that form the city's Water Department's facilities.

It was added to the National Register of Historic Places in 2005.
