= North Main Street Historic District (Hannibal, Missouri) =

- U.S. National Register of Historic Places
- U.S. Historic district
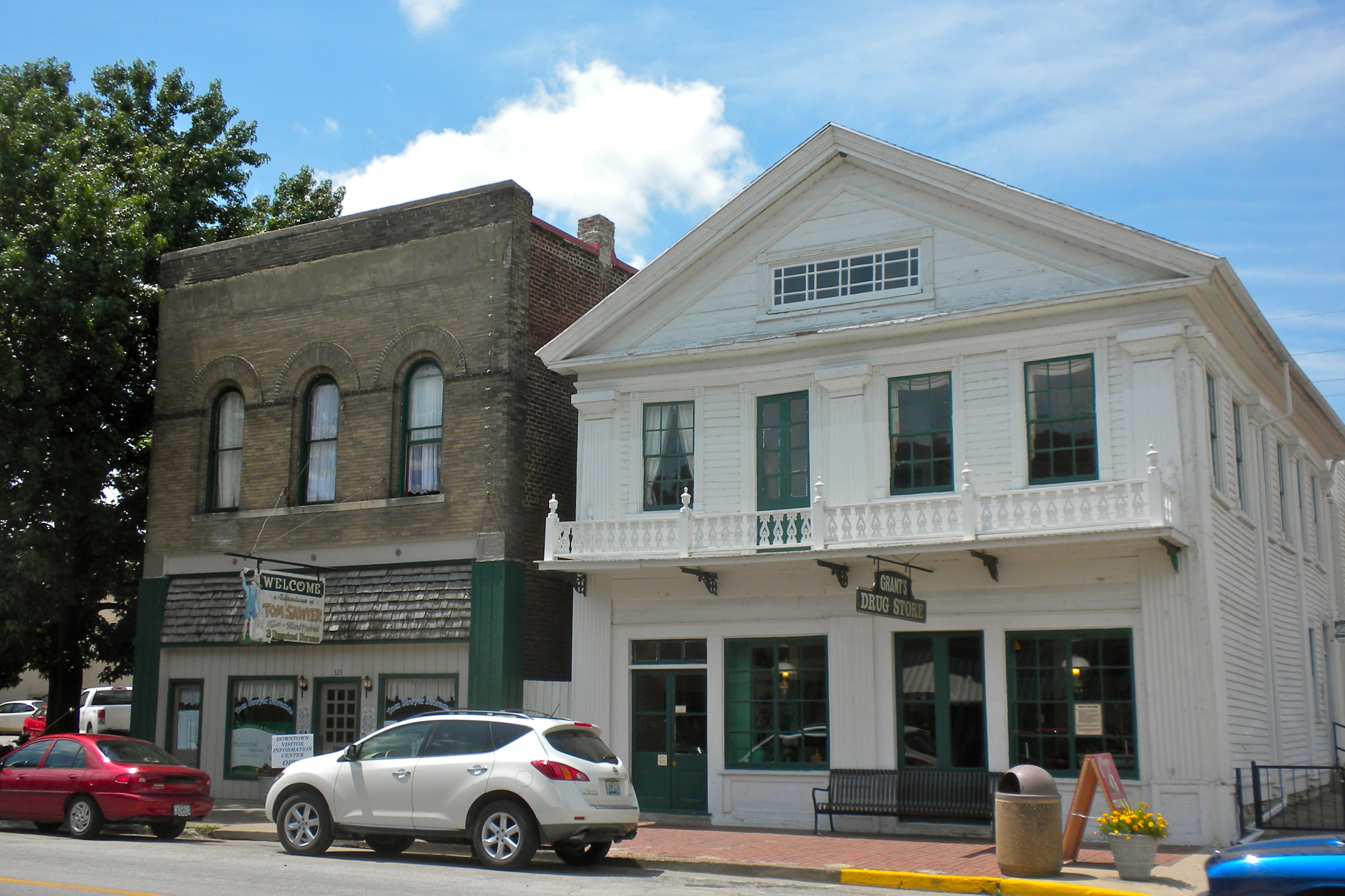
- North Main Street Historic District, July 2010

- Location within Missouri Location within the United States
- Location: Roughly bounded by Bird, N. Main, and Hill Sts., Hannibal, Missouri
- Coordinates: 39°42′40″N 91°21′22″W
- Area: 1.7 acres (0.69 ha)
- Built: 1852
- Architectural style: Beaux Arts, Italianate
- MPS: Hannibal Central Business District MRA
- NRHP reference No.: 86002137
- Added to NRHP: August 1, 1986

North Main Street Historic District is a national historic district located at Hannibal, Marion County, Missouri. The district encompasses 27 contributing buildings in the central business district of Hannibal. It developed between about 1852 and 1935, and includes representative examples of Italianate and Beaux Arts architecture. Notable buildings include the Lone Building (1853), Brown's Drug Store (1858), Old Central Hotel (1868-1874), Old Schultz Furniture Store (c 1863), Original Farmers and Merchants Bank (1876), Jameson Hawkins Row (1852), Bernice Gano Tavern (c. 1935), and A. W. Lamb Building (c. 1870-1875).

It was listed on the National Register of Historic Places in 1986.
