= Media Farm =

Historic house in West Virginia, United States

- U.S. National Register of Historic Places
- Location within West Virginia Location within the United States
- Nearest city: Ranson, West Virginia
- Coordinates: 39°19′46″N 77°50′32″W
- Architectural style: Gothic Revival
- NRHP reference No.: 93000616
- Added to NRHP: November 10, 1994

Media Farm is a farm complex near Charles Town, West Virginia that dates to 1780, and has remained in the same family ever since. The property was acquired by Charles Yates, an English immigrant, from Thomas Rutherford. In the twentieth century, author Julia McDonald Davis spent her childhood summers at the farm. Her father, who visited the farm frequently, was lawyer, diplomat and presidential candidate John W. Davis.

The original house was a log structure, with a stone addition added in 1790. The house grew and its present appearance is Gothic Revival. During World War I several small tenant houses were built on the farm to house "farmerettes," who were city women brought from urban areas to assist farmers whose labor force had gone to war.
