= Gardner House (Palmyra, Missouri) =

Historic house in Missouri, United States

- U.S. National Register of Historic Places
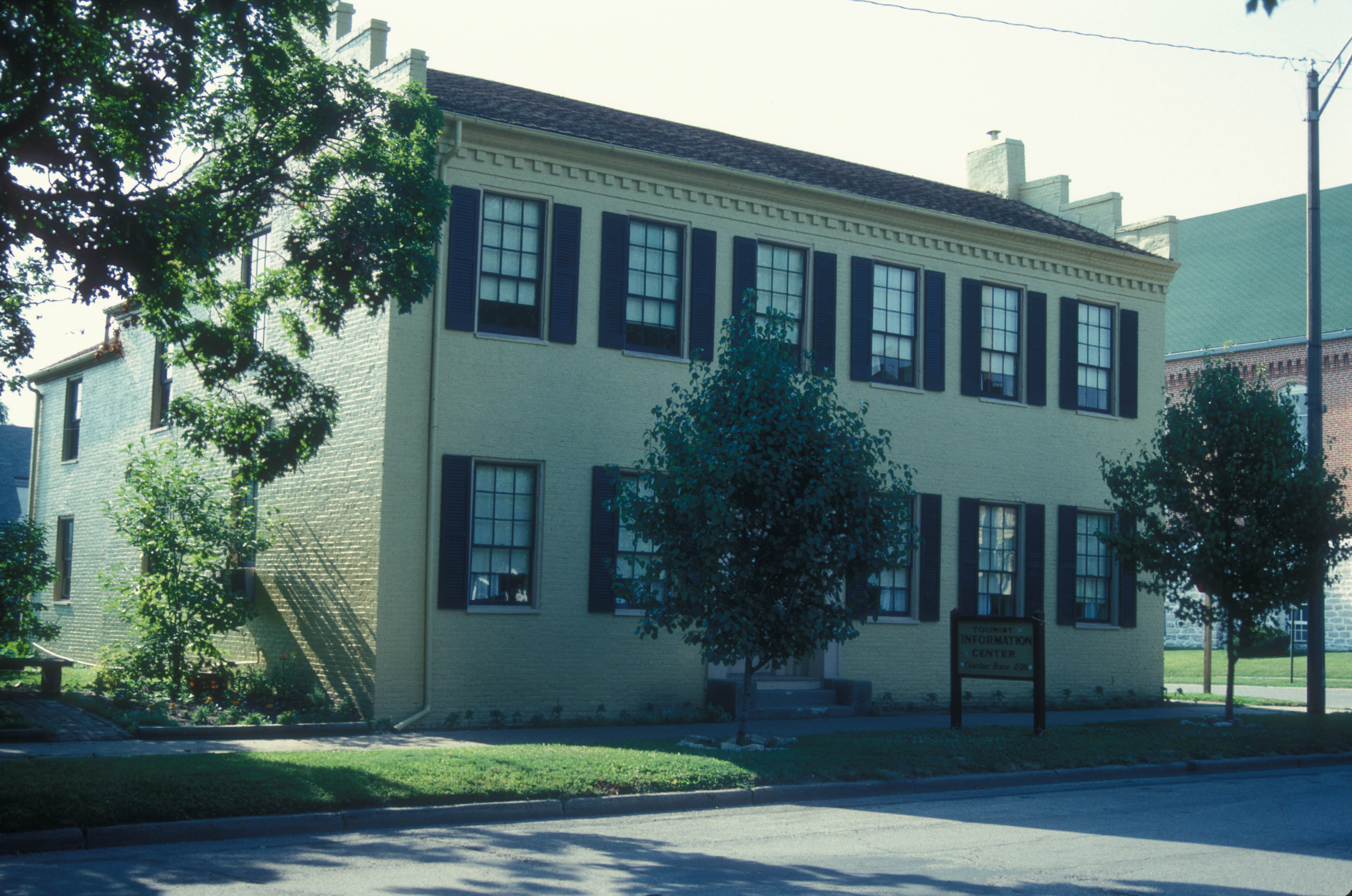
- Gardner House, January 2007

- Location within Missouri Location within the United States
- Location: 421 Hamilton and Main Sts., Palmyra, Missouri
- Coordinates: 39°47′46″N 91°31′20″W
- Area: Less than 1 acre (0.40 ha)
- Built: 1828
- Architectural style: Federal, Greek Revival
- NRHP reference No.: 71000470
- Added to NRHP: March 4, 1971

Gardner House is a historic home located at Palmyra, Marion County, Missouri. It was built about, and is a two-story, "L" plan, Federal style painted brick dwelling, with Greek Revival style detailing. It is six bays wide and has a side-gable roof. It once housed a tavern located on a north–south stage coach route between St. Louis, Missouri and east Iowan towns.

It was added to the National Register of Historic Places in 1971.
