= Hock Building =

- U.S. National Register of Historic Places
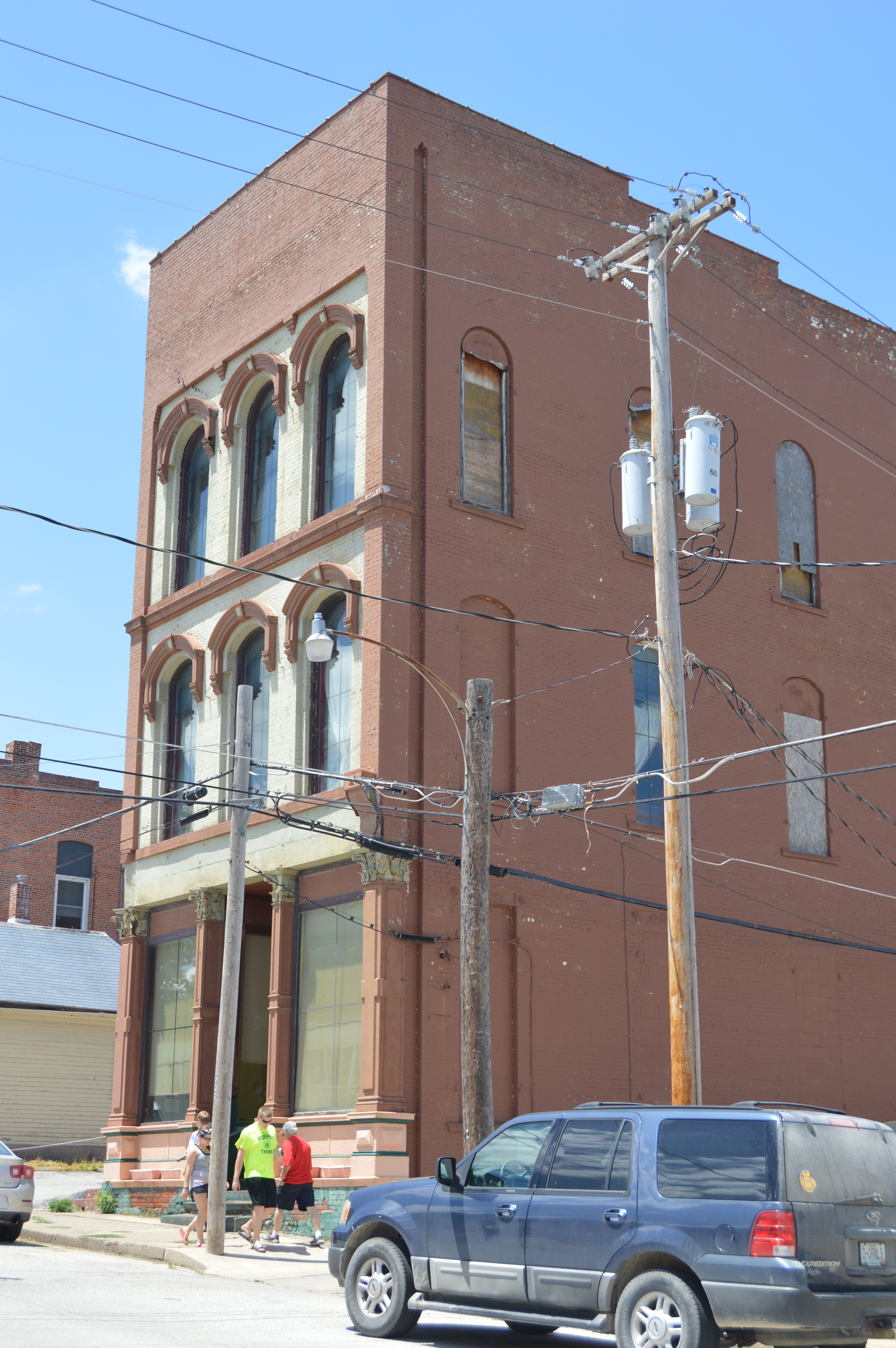
- Hock Building, July 2014

- Location within Missouri Location within the United States
- Location: 312 Center St., Hannibal, Missouri
- Coordinates: 39°42′36″N 91°21′28″W
- Area: 0.1 acres (0.040 ha)
- Built: 1872
- Built by: J.M. Patton
- MPS: Hannibal Central Business District MRA
- NRHP reference No.: 86003588
- Added to NRHP: December 2, 1986

Hock Building, also known as Standard Printing Company, Warehouse No. 8, is a historic commercial building located at Hannibal in Marion County, Missouri. It was built in 1872, and is a three-story brick structure, three bays wide and eight deep. It features arched windows with thick cast-iron moldings above and iron pilasters at the first floor storefront.

It was added to the National Register of Historic Places in 1986.
