= Digel Block =

- U.S. National Register of Historic Places
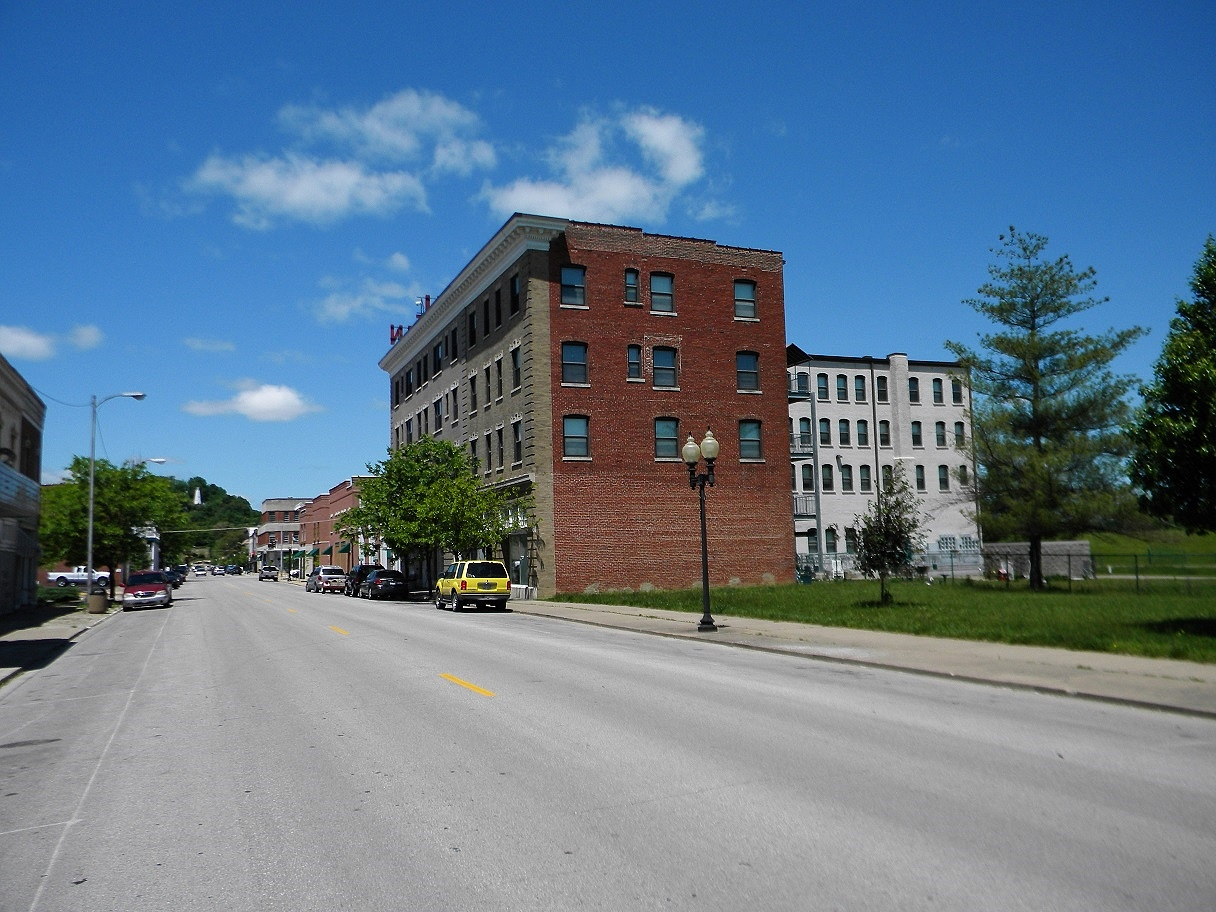
- Digel Block site, May 2016

- Location within Missouri Location within the United States
- Location: 218-222 S. Main St., Hannibal, Missouri
- Coordinates: 39°42′30″N 91°21′15″W
- Area: 0.2 acres (0.081 ha)
- Built: 1901
- Built by: Courtney Bros.
- Architectural style: Small Town Commercial
- MPS: Hannibal Central Business District MRA
- NRHP reference No.: 86002131
- Added to NRHP: August 1, 1986

Digel Block was a historic commercial building located at Hannibal, Marion County, Missouri. It was built in 1901, and was a two-story red-brick building. It featured an ornamental parapet screening a flat roof. It has been demolished.

It was added to the National Register of Historic Places in 1986.
