= Marion County Jail and Jailor's House =

United States historic place

- U.S. National Register of Historic Places
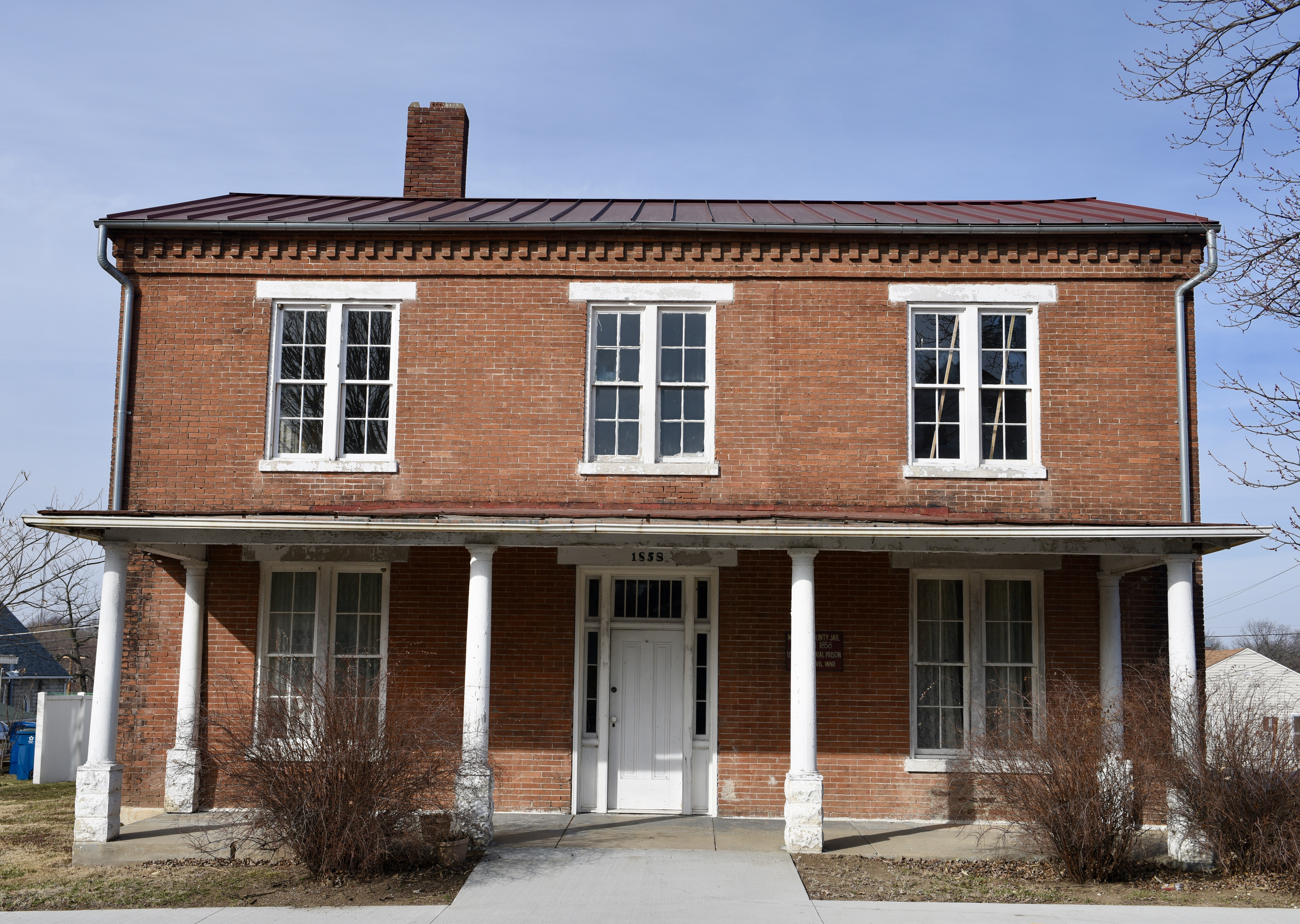

- Location within Missouri Location within the United States
- Location: 210 W. Lafayette St. Palmyra, Missouri
- Coordinates: 39°47′55″N 91°31′28″W
- Area: less than one acre
- Built: 1858
- Built by: Asay, A.B.
- Architectural style: Greek Revival
- NRHP reference No.: 02001100
- Added to NRHP: October 4, 2002

Marion County Jail and Jailor's House, also known as the Palmyra Jail and Palmyra Massacre Jail, is a historic jail and sheriff's residence located at Palmyra, Marion County, Missouri. It was built in 1858, and is a two-story, three-bay, Greek Revival-style brick I-house with a broad two-story limestone ell. It features a full-width, one-story front porch supported by smooth tampering Doric order columns. The building housed the ten men, accused of being Confederate partisans, who were selected by Union authorities to be executed in reprisal for the disappearance of a local Union supporter. Referred to as the Palmyra massacre, the execution of the accused took place on October 18, 1862.

It was added to the National Register of Historic Places in 2002.

== See also ==
- Henry County Courthouse, Jail, and Warden's House
- National Register of Historic Places listings in Marion County, Missouri
