= Ephraim J. Wilson Farm Complex =

Historic house in Missouri, United States

- U.S. National Register of Historic Places
- Location within Missouri Location within the United States
- Location: East of Palmyra off Route 168, near Palmyra, Missouri
- Coordinates: 39°45′45″N 91°29′16″W
- Area: 31 acres (13 ha)
- Built: c. 1842, 1888, 1889
- Architectural style: Federal
- NRHP reference No.: 82000587
- Added to NRHP: December 28, 1982

Ephraim J. Wilson Farm Complex is a historic home and farm located near Palmyra, Marion County, Missouri. The house was built about 1842, and is a two-story, Federal style brick I-house with a rear frame addition built around 1889. Also on the property are the contributing timber frame bank barn built by a Mennonite of Pennsylvania German extraction in 1888, and an ice house. It was added to the National Register of Historic Places in 1982.
