= Culbertson–Head Farmstead =

- U.S. National Register of Historic Places
- U.S. Historic district
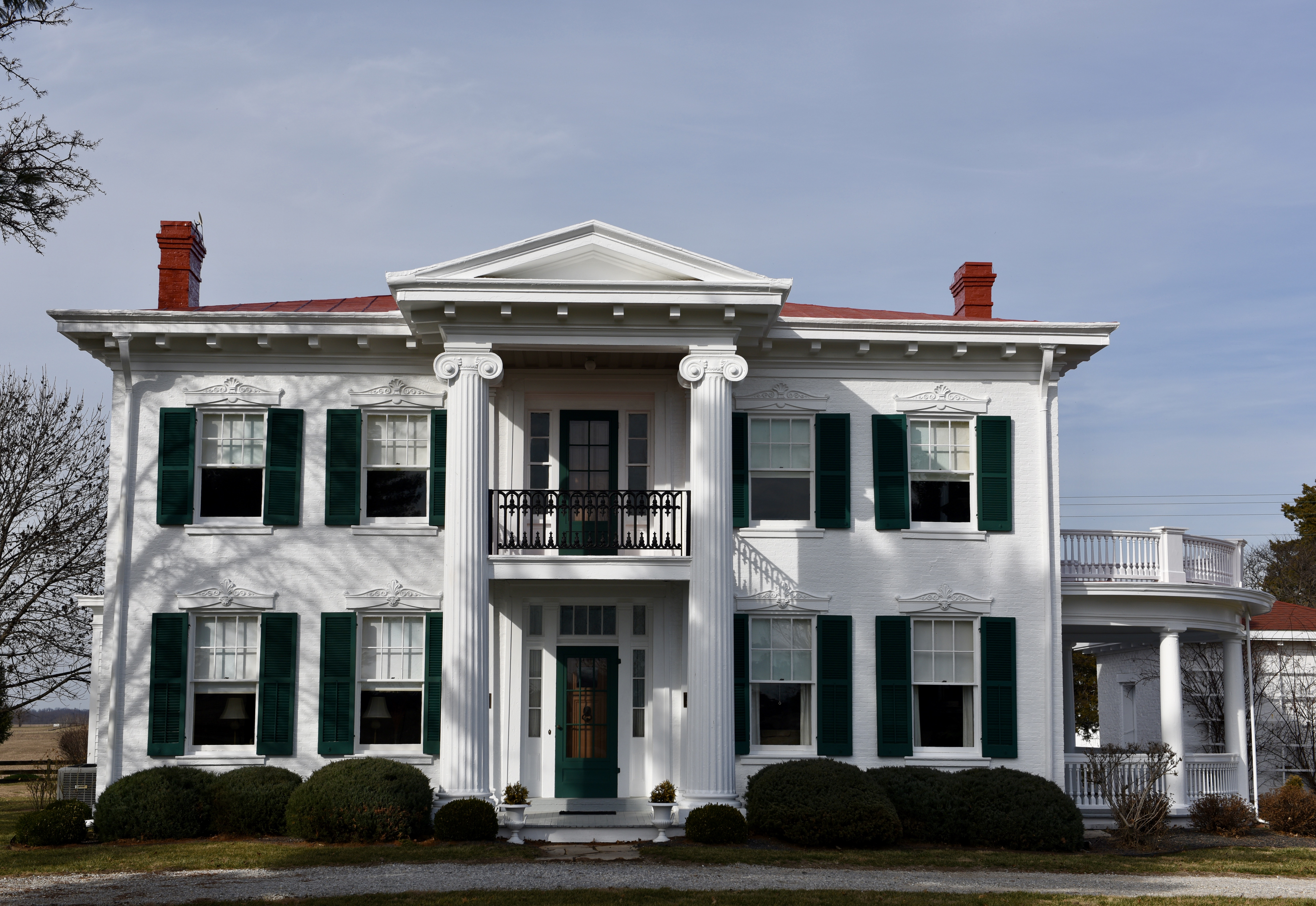

- Location within Missouri Location within the United States
- Location: 7178 Co. Rd. 402; Palmyra, Missouri
- Coordinates: 39°47′41″N 91°30′33″W
- Area: 33.3 acres (13.5 ha)
- Built: 1854-1855
- Built by: Calvert, Ziba
- Architectural style: Greek Revival, Catalog barn
- NRHP reference No.: 08000838
- Added to NRHP: September 4, 2008

Culbertson–Head Farmstead is a historic home, farm, and national historic district located near Palmyra, Marion County, Missouri. The house was built about 1854–1855, and is a two-story, L-shaped, Greek Revival style brick dwelling. It features a two-story front portico. Also on the property are the contributing smokehouse / ice house (pre-1915); shop (c. 1927); large Jamesway, gambrel roof barn (1927); gabled roofed, wood granary (corn crib) (ca. 1927); and transverse crib barn (1880s).

It was added to the National Register of Historic Places in 1982.
