= Holmes–Dakin Building =

- U.S. National Register of Historic Places
- Location within Missouri Location within the United States
- Location: 120--122 S. Main St., Hannibal, Missouri
- Coordinates: 39°42′33″N 91°21′17″W
- Area: 0.1 acres (0.040 ha)
- Built: 1894
- Built by: Patton, John M.
- MPS: Hannibal Central Business District MRA
- NRHP reference No.: 86002135
- Added to NRHP: August 1, 1986

Holmes–Dakin Building is a historic commercial building located at Hannibal, Marion County, Missouri. It was built in 1894, and is a two-story brick structure with a coursed rubble foundation and a flat roof. It features a corbelled brick frieze with matching corbelled parapet, capped by a stone molding. It originally housed a cigar factory.

It was added to the National Register of Historic Places in 1986.
