= Speigle House =

Historic house in Missouri, United States

- U.S. National Register of Historic Places
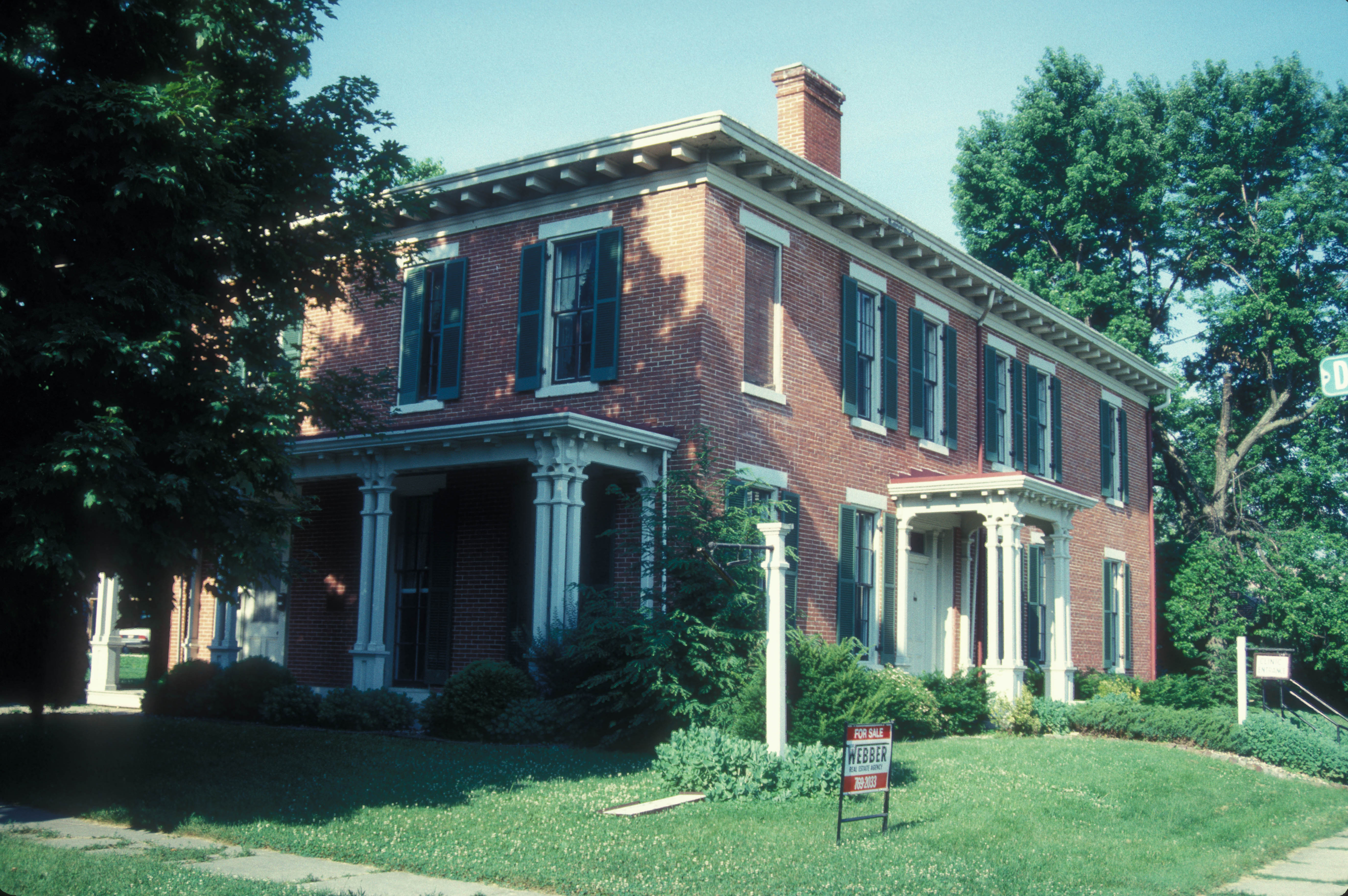
- Speigle House, January 2007

- Location within Missouri Location within the United States
- Location: 406 S. Dickerson, Palmyra, Missouri
- Coordinates: 39°47′48″N 91°31′28″W
- Area: 0.6 acres (0.24 ha)
- Built: c. 1850
- Architectural style: Italianate, Vernacular Italianate, Greek Revival
- NRHP reference No.: 85000283
- Added to NRHP: February 14, 1985

Speigle House is a historic home located at Palmyra, Marion County, Missouri. It was built about 1850, and is a two-story, transitional vernacular Greek Revival / Italianate style brick dwelling. It has a two-story rear ell off the main block and hipped roof with bracketed cornice.

It was added to the National Register of Historic Places in 1985.
