= Palmyra, Missouri =

City in Missouri, U.S.

- City
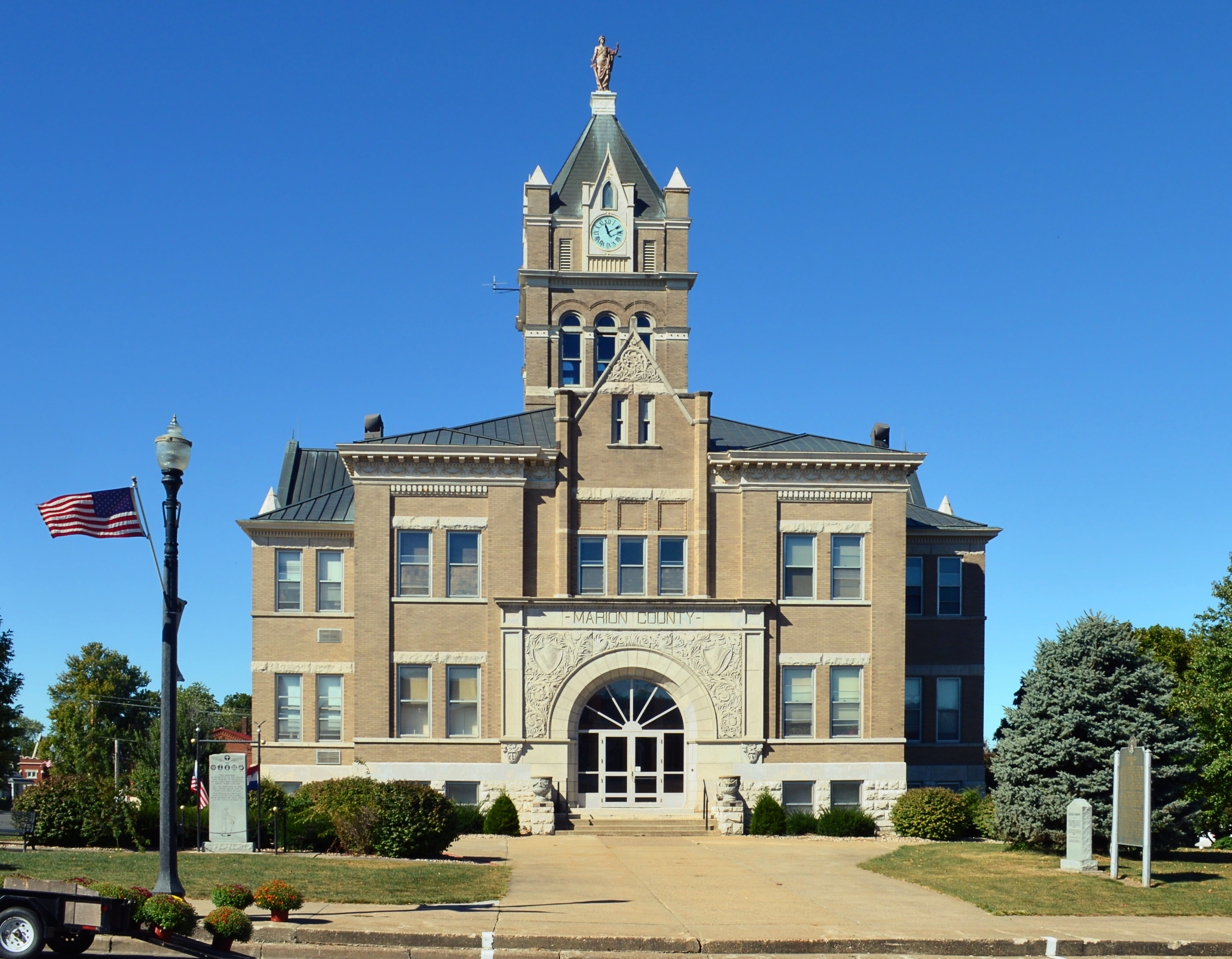
- Marion County Courthouse

- Location in Marion County and the state of Missouri
- Coordinates: 39°47′52″N 91°31′35″W
- Country: United States
- State: Missouri
- County: Marion

Government
  - Mayor: Rusty Adrian

Area
  - Total: 3.10 sq mi (8.04 km^{2})
  - Land: 3.10 sq mi (8.04 km^{2})
  - Water: 0 sq mi (0.00 km^{2})
- Elevation: 620 ft (190 m)

Population (2020)
  - Total: 3,613
  - Density: 1,164.5/sq mi (449.63/km^{2})
- Time zone: UTC-6 (Central (CST))
  - Summer (DST): UTC-5 (CDT)
- ZIP code: 63461
- Area code: 573
- FIPS code: 29-56036
- GNIS feature ID: 2396131
- Website: www.showmepalmyra.com

Palmyra is a city in and the county seat of Marion County, Missouri, United States. The population was 3,613 at the 2020 census. It is part of the Hannibal Micropolitan Statistical Area.

== History ==
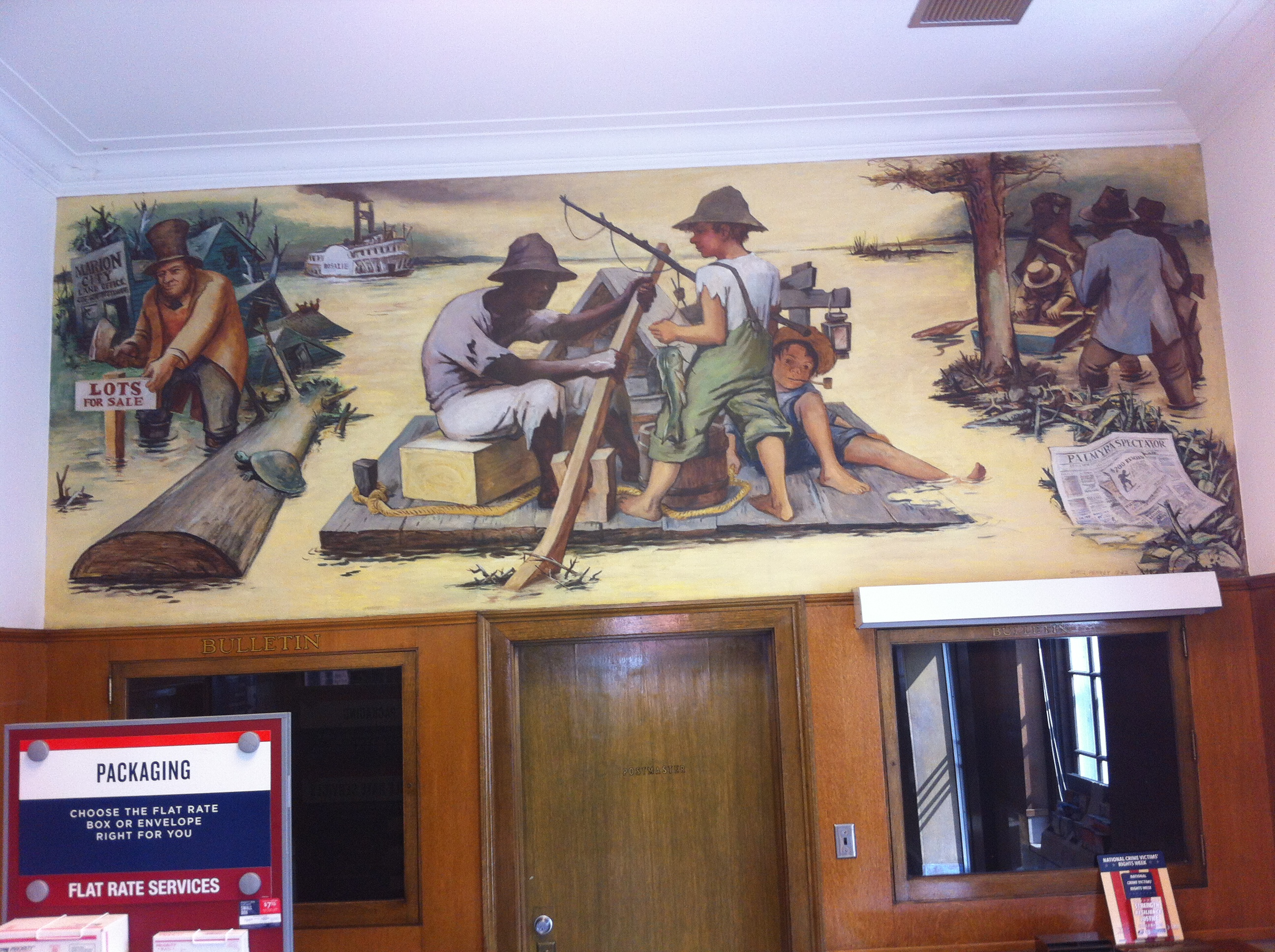
WPA mural, Memories of Marion County by James Penny, in Palmyra post office

Palmyra was platted in 1819 and named after the ancient city of Palmyra in Syria. The settlement was designated county seat in 1827. A post office called Palmyra has been in operation since 1830.

In 1862, the city was the scene of the Palmyra Massacre, in which ten Confederate prisoners were killed in retaliation for the disappearance of a local Union man.

The Culbertson-Head Farmstead, Dryden-Louthan House, Gardner House, Marion County Jail and Jailor's House, Peter J. Sowers House, Speigle House, Walker-Woodward-Schaffer House, and Ephraim J. Wilson Farm Complex are listed on the National Register of Historic Places.

== Geography ==
Palmyra is in east-central Marion County, 13 miles (21 km) northwest of Hannibal, the largest city in the county, and 6 miles (10 km) west of the Mississippi River. Quincy, Illinois, is 16 miles (26 km) to the northeast, and Canton is 25 miles (40 km) to the north.

According to the U.S. Census Bureau, Palmyra has a total area of 3.10 square miles (8.03 km^{2}), all land. The city is bordered to the north by the North River, a direct tributary of the Mississippi.

== Demographics ==
Historical population
| Census | Pop. | Note | %± |
|---|---|---|---|
| 1850 | 1,265 | | — |
| 1860 | 1,999 | | 58.0% |
| 1870 | 2,615 | | 30.8% |
| 1880 | 2,479 | | −5.2% |
| 1890 | 2,515 | | 1.5% |
| 1900 | 2,323 | | −7.6% |
| 1910 | 2,168 | | −6.7% |
| 1920 | 1,964 | | −9.4% |
| 1930 | 1,967 | | 0.2% |
| 1940 | 2,285 | | 16.2% |
| 1950 | 2,295 | | 0.4% |
| 1960 | 2,933 | | 27.8% |
| 1970 | 3,188 | | 8.7% |
| 1980 | 3,469 | | 8.8% |
| 1990 | 3,371 | | −2.8% |
| 2000 | 3,467 | | 2.8% |
| 2010 | 3,595 | | 3.7% |
| 2020 | 3,613 | | 0.5% |
U.S. Decennial Census

=== 2020 census ===
As of the 2020 census, Palmyra had a population of 3,613. The median age was 39.4 years. 24.4% of residents were under the age of 18 and 20.4% of residents were 65 years of age or older. For every 100 females there were 96.4 males, and for every 100 females age 18 and over there were 96.8 males age 18 and over.

0.0% of residents lived in urban areas, while 100.0% lived in rural areas.

There were 1,468 households in Palmyra, of which 31.5% had children under the age of 18 living in them. Of all households, 43.8% were married-couple households, 19.0% were households with a male householder and no spouse or partner present, and 29.1% were households with a female householder and no spouse or partner present. About 30.9% of all households were made up of individuals and 14.6% had someone living alone who was 65 years of age or older.

There were 1,606 housing units, of which 8.6% were vacant. The homeowner vacancy rate was 1.4% and the rental vacancy rate was 7.8%.

Racial composition as of the 2020 census
| Race | Number | Percent |
|---|---|---|
| White | 3,318 | 91.8% |
| Black or African American | 92 | 2.5% |
| American Indian and Alaska Native | 10 | 0.3% |
| Asian | 16 | 0.4% |
| Native Hawaiian and Other Pacific Islander | 1 | 0.0% |
| Some other race | 22 | 0.6% |
| Two or more races | 154 | 4.3% |
| Hispanic or Latino (of any race) | 75 | 2.1% |

=== 2010 census ===
As of the census of 2010, there were 3,595 people, 1,425 households, and 963 families living in the city. The population density was 1,302.5 inhabitants per square mile (502.9/km^{2}). There were 1,557 housing units at an average density of 564.1 per square mile (217.8/km^{2}). The racial makeup of the city was 95.1% White, 2.6% African American, 0.1% Native American, 0.3% Asian, 0.1% Pacific Islander, 0.4% from other races, and 1.4% from two or more races. Hispanic or Latino of any race were 1.2% of the population.

There were 1,425 households, of which 34.9% had children under the age of 18 living with them, 49.5% were married couples living together, 13.7% had a female householder with no husband present, 4.4% had a male householder with no wife present, and 32.4% were non-families. 29.3% of all households were made up of individuals, and 14.8% had someone living alone who was 65 years of age or older. The average household size was 2.38 and the average family size was 2.91.

The median age in the city was 37.7 years. 25.4% of residents were under the age of 18; 6.9% were between the ages of 18 and 24; 26.7% were from 25 to 44; 22.8% were from 45 to 64; and 18.4% were 65 years of age or older. The gender makeup of the city was 47.5% male and 52.5% female.

=== 2000 census ===
As of the census of 2000, there were 3,467 people, 1,372 households, and 923 families living in the city. The population density was 1,559.9 inhabitants per square mile (602.3/km^{2}). There were 1,522 housing units at an average density of 684.8 per square mile (264.4/km^{2}). The racial makeup of the city was 96.22% White, 2.62% African American, 0.23% Native American, 0.26% Asian, 0.03% from other races, and 0.63% from two or more races. Hispanic or Latino of any race were 0.61% of the population.

There were 1,372 households, out of which 33.6% had children under the age of 18 living with them, 52.5% were married couples living together, 11.4% had a female householder with no husband present, and 32.7% were non-families. 30.0% of all households were made up of individuals, and 16.1% had someone living alone who was 65 years of age or older. The average household size was 2.38 and the average family size was 2.94.

In the city, the population was spread out, with 24.8% under the age of 18, 8.9% from 18 to 24, 25.6% from 25 to 44, 20.7% from 45 to 64, and 20.0% who were 65 years of age or older. The median age was 38 years. For every 100 females, there were 88.2 males. For every 100 females age 18 and over, there were 84.3 males.

The median income for a household in the city was $31,284, and the median income for a family was $42,946. Males had a median income of $30,829 versus $19,631 for females. The per capita income for the city was $15,625. About 5.5% of families and 8.1% of the population were below the poverty line, including 7.3% of those under the age of 18 and 10.5% of those 65 and older.

== Transportation ==
On US 61-24, a divided highway, Palmyra is 6 miles (10 km) north of I-72 (US 36). St. Louis is 127 miles (204 km) to the southeast by US 61; Springfield, Illinois, is 113 miles (182 km) to the east by I-72. Daily Amtrak trains to downtown Chicago leave from nearby Quincy, Illinois.

== Education ==
Palmyra's school district serves a 200-square-mile area with 6,700 people; there are 1,150 students and 170 teachers and staff. There are strong early childhood programs, a private parochial school and several day-care facilities. Nearby Hannibal, Canton, Moberly, and Quincy are home to Hannibal-LaGrange College, Culver-Stockton College, Moberly Area Community College, Quincy University, and John Wood Community College.

Palmyra has a lending library, the Palmyra Bicentennial Public Library.

== Notable people ==
- Jane Darwell, winner of the 1940 Academy Award for Best Supporting Actress
- William Payne Jackson, U.S. Army major general
- Harry Richard Landis, one of the last two surviving World War I veterans
- Skylar Thompson, quarterback for the Baltimore Ravens

== See also ==
- List of cities in Missouri
