= Marion College (Missouri) =

Former historic manual labor college

- Type: Manual labor college
- Active: 1831–1844
- Founders: David Nelson; William Muldrow; David Clark
- Religious affiliation: Presbyterian
- President: David Nelson (1832–1835); William S. Potts (1835–1839); Hiram P. Goodrich (1839–1843); John Blatchford (1843–1844)
- Location: Philadelphia, Missouri; Ely, Missouri

Marion College was a small school in Marion County, Missouri, 1831–1844. It was the first college to be chartered by the Missouri state legislature, and the second educational institution in Missouri to be granted the right to confer college and university degrees. Founded in 1831, Marion College was originally planned as a manual labor college focusing primarily on agriculture, while also teaching classics. From 1835, it also incorporated a theological seminary. The school was founded by private individuals, but was strongly Presbyterian. Its three schools were located in Philadelphia, East Ely and West Ely in Marion County, Missouri.

The college attracted many investors, faculty and students from the East. It was opposed by proslavery residents of northeastern Missouri, who were particularly critical of founder and president David Nelson, an antislavery activist. Marion College was also part of a speculative bubble in Marion County, involving investment in Marion City, Philadelphia, and a planned railroad line. Enrollment dropped following the financial crisis of 1837, and by the spring of 1844, the college had closed.

== History ==
Marion College was originally conceived as a manual labor college, where each student would be assigned several acres of land to farm, working under a professor. By working the land a few hours each day, each student would be able to pay their tuition and room and board. The founders were the Reverend Dr. David Nelson, William Muldrow, and Dr. David Clark. Nelson served as the college's first president, as well as its first teacher.

The institution was organized with an "upper" campus in Philadelphia, Missouri, and a larger "lower" campus located about twelve miles southeast at East Ely and West Ely. The college had three departments: the preparatory school, a literary or "collegiate" department which focused heavily on classics, and a theological seminary established on May 11, 1835. Marion College was described as having the "airs of Yale and Harvard" and was called "a western Andover" by its proslavery opponents.

In 1835, William S. Potts, pastor of the First Presbyterian Church in St. Louis, Missouri agreed to serve as president after Nelson stepped down. Nelson was unpopular within Marion County due to his abolitionist views, and was famously driven out of the state in 1836. In 1838, Reverend Hiram P. Goodrich joined as vice president and took over from Potts as president in 1839. Reverend John Blatchford served as president from 1843 to 1844.

The first yearbook for Marion College appeared in 1835 and lists 80 students, 52 of whom were from other states such as New York, Pennsylvania, Ohio, and Virginia. For the 1837–1838 school year, there were 91 students enrolled, 43 of whom were from Missouri, with 16 states represented in the student body.

The financial panic of 1837 led to a decline in enrollment. There were only 70 students in 1838, and 62 in 1839. By 1841, there were only 47 students. Marion College started its final term in operation on May 5, 1843.

== Funding ==
For unknown reasons, the founders of Marion College did not seek funding from the Missouri state legislature, which showed considerable interest in manual labor schools in the 1830s, or from the state seminary fund.

Marion College initially received a pledge for $10,000 from the education board of the Presbyterian Church to purchase land, but the agreement was dissolved after a misunderstanding. In April 1833, founders Nelson, Muldrow and Clark borrowed $20,000 from a bank in New York City which they used to purchase nearly 5,000 acres of land. At this point, they had envisioned hiring 12 professors and having at least 420 students. In 1834, they traveled East and raised another $19,000.

A major donor to the school was Reverend Ezra Stiles Ely, who joined the faculty and invested between $60,000 to $100,000 of his own money. Ely was put in charge of the lower campus. Large-scale building work began in the summer of 1835. By this time, the trustees of Marion College announced that they hoped to add a law school and a medical school in the future. They were also considering opening a girls' school nearby.

The Philadelphia campus included "a president's house, a recitation hall, dining hall, all in brick, and the famous 'Brick Row' of twenty-eight dormitories." The "lower" campus near Ely included "a one-story brick boarding house, 90 x 26 feet, with a kitchen back, six brick cottages, two one-story frame cottages, a frame storehouse, log-cabins, barns, a blacksmith shop, and other buildings."

Marion College was also part of a massive speculative scheme on the part of William Muldrow and Ezra Stiles Ely. Together, they sold lots of land in Marion City, which Muldrow envisioned as the future "metropolis of the West", as well as Philadelphia, and promoted the development of the Marion City and Missouri railroad. The speculative bubble burst after the financial panic of 1837 led to the ruin of many of its investors from the East. Many professors and ministers associated with Marion College went bankrupt.

The college was refinanced in 1842 in an effort to save it. Hervey H. Hayes, the principal of the preparatory school, became the owner of the upper and lower campus buildings and 1,350 acres of land, which was then purchased by the Masonic Grand Lodge of Missouri for $9,500 on September 12, 1842. Classes at the new Masonic College of Missouri began in May 1844.

== Notable faculty ==
- Ezra Stiles Ely resigned as pastor of the Presbyterian Church in Philadelphia, Missouri to join the faculty as "professor of polemic theology"
- William S. Potts was a "professor of belles lettres and mental and moral philosophy" in addition to serving as college president
- James Gallaher, a noted author and preacher from Cincinnati, Ohio, was "professor of didactic theology and sacred eloquence"
- Charles W. Nassau taught Greek and Hebrew language courses
- John Thomson, a professor at University of Nashville, joined as the chair of natural philosophy, mathematics, and chemistry
- Hervey H. Hayes, principal of the manual labor institute at Zelienople, Pennsylvania, became principal of the preparatory school at Marion College

== Notable alumni ==
- Henry Watkins Allen went on to become the 17th Governor of Louisiana, a soldier in the Confederate States Army and the Texian Army, writer, sugar cane planter
- Thomas Hart Benton, nephew and namesake of Missouri Senator Thomas Hart Benton, attended the prep school and went on to become active in Iowa state politics and education
- Frederick T. Kemper later founded the school that became Kemper Military School in Boonville, Missouri
- Alfred William Lamb was later elected as a Missouri Congressman and curator at University of Missouri

== Sources and further reading ==
- Mahan, George A. "David Nelson and Marion College." Missouri Historical Review 21 (January 1927): 185–187. online
- Parrish, William E. Westminster College: An Informal History, 1851–1999. 2000.
- Sampson, F. A. "Marion College and Its Founders." Missouri Historical Review 20 (July 1926): 485–488. online
- Who Was Who in America, Historical Volume, 1607–1896. Chicago: Marquis Who's Who, 1967.
