= Allen Branch (Troublesome Creek tributary) =

Stream in Missouri, U.S.

Allen Branch Tributary to Troublesome Creek
- Location of Allen Branch mouth

Location
- Country: United States
- State: Missouri
- County: Lewis

Physical characteristics
- Source: Seebers Branch divide
  - location: about 2 miles north of Steffenville, Missouri
  - coordinates: 39°59′32″N 91°53′11″W
  - elevation: 721 ft (220 m)
- Mouth: Troublesome Creek
  - location: about 4 east-southeast of Steffenville, Missouri
  - coordinates: 39°57′46″N 91°48′43″W
  - elevation: 594 ft (181 m)
- Length: 5.65 mi (9.09 km)
- Basin size: 5.97 square miles (15.5 km^{2})
- Discharge
  - location: Troublesome Creek
  - average: 5.71 cu ft/s (0.162 m^{3}/s) at mouth with Troublesome Creek

Basin features
- Progression: Troublesome Creek → South Fabius River → Fabius River → Mississippi River → Gulf of Mexico
- River system: Fabius River
- Tributaries
  - left: unnamed tributaries
  - right: unnamed tributaries
- Bridges: 140th Avenue, 295th Street, 303rd Street

Allen Branch is a stream in Lewis County, Missouri, United States. It is a tributary of Troublesome Creek.

Allen Branch has the name of N. E. Allen, the original owner of the site.

== Course ==
Allen Branch rises about 2 miles north of Steffenville, Missouri, and then flows generally southeast to join Troublesome Creek about 4 miles east-southeast of Steffenville.

== Watershed ==
Allen Branch drains 5.97 square miles (15.5 km^{2}) of area, receives about 36.9 in/year of precipitation, has a wetness index of 417.88, and is about 22% forested.

== See also ==
- List of rivers of Missouri
