= Seeber =

Seeber may refer to:

- Francisco Seeber (1841–1913), Argentine military officer
- Guido Seeber (1879–1940), German cinematographer
- Horacio Seeber, (1907–1972), Argentine sailor
- Kristian Seeber, American drag queen
- Ludwig August Seeber (1793–1855), German physicist
- Richard Seeber (born 1962), Austrian politician
- Robert Rex Seeber Jr. (1910–1969), American inventor

== See also ==
- Seebers Branch, stream
