= Troublesome Creek (Missouri) =

River in Missouri, United States

Troublesome Creek is a stream in Knox, Lewis and Marion counties in the northeastern part of the U.S. state of Missouri. It is a tributary of the South Fabius River.

The stream headwaters arise in Knox County adjacent to Missouri Route 15 north of Edina at 40°12′49″N 92°10′35″W and it flows to the southeast. It crosses under Missouri Route 6 east of Edina and on to the south of Knox City and enters Lewis County south of La Belle. It crosses Missouri Route 156 northeast of Steffenville and enters Marion County northeast of the community of Nelsonville. It passes south of the community of Naomi and enters the South Fabius south of the community of Hester at 39°54′17″N 91°37′17″W.

Troublesome Creek was so named on account of its frequent flash floods.

== See also ==
- List of rivers of Missouri
