= Benbow =

Benbow may refer to:

== Places ==
- Benbow, a locality in Woodlands County, Alberta, Canada
- Benbow, California, a community in Humboldt County, California, United States
- Benbow, Missouri, United States
- Benbow Lake, on the South Fork Eel River, California, United States
- Benbow (volcano), a volcano on Ambrym island, Vanuatu

== Other uses ==
- Benbow (surname)
- 256797 Benbow, a main belt asteroid
- HMS Benbow, three Royal Navy ships
- Benbow Class, later name of the LNWR Alfred the Great Class of railway compound locomotive

== See also ==
- Benbo, a Nigerian village - see List of villages in Oyo State
