= Naomi, Missouri =

Unincorporated community in Missouri, U.S.

Coordinates: 39°55′35″N 91°41′45″W

Naomi is an unincorporated community in northwest Marion County, in the U.S. state of Missouri. The community is located on Troublesome Creek. Emerson is 2.5 miles to the south and Hester is four miles to the east.

== History ==
Naomi was platted in 1869, and named after Naomi, a figure mentioned in the Hebrew Bible. A post office called Naomi was established in 1873, and remained in operation until 1905.
