= Rickey Hollow =

Valley in Missouri, United States

Coordinates: 39.688934°N 91.402650°W

Rickey Hollow is a valley in Marion County in the U.S. state of Missouri.

Rickey Hollow has the name of the local Rickey family.
