= Little Union =

Little Union may refer to:

- The unification of Moldavia and Wallachia, which founded modern Romania, in 1859, commonly known in the country as the Mica Unire ("Little Union", also translated as the "Small Union")
  - The Day of the Unification of the Romanian Principalities, a holiday commemorating this event, sometimes known as the Little Union Day
- Little Union, Missouri, unincorporated community in Marion County in Missouri, in the United States
- The Little Union River, a river in the United States
