= College Branch =

Stream in the American state of Missouri

Coordinates: 39°44′50″N 91°31′48″W

College Branch is a stream in Marion County in the U.S. state of Missouri.

College Branch took its name from a now defunct college in West Ely.

== See also ==
- List of rivers of Missouri
