= Standard Printing Company =

- U.S. National Register of Historic Places
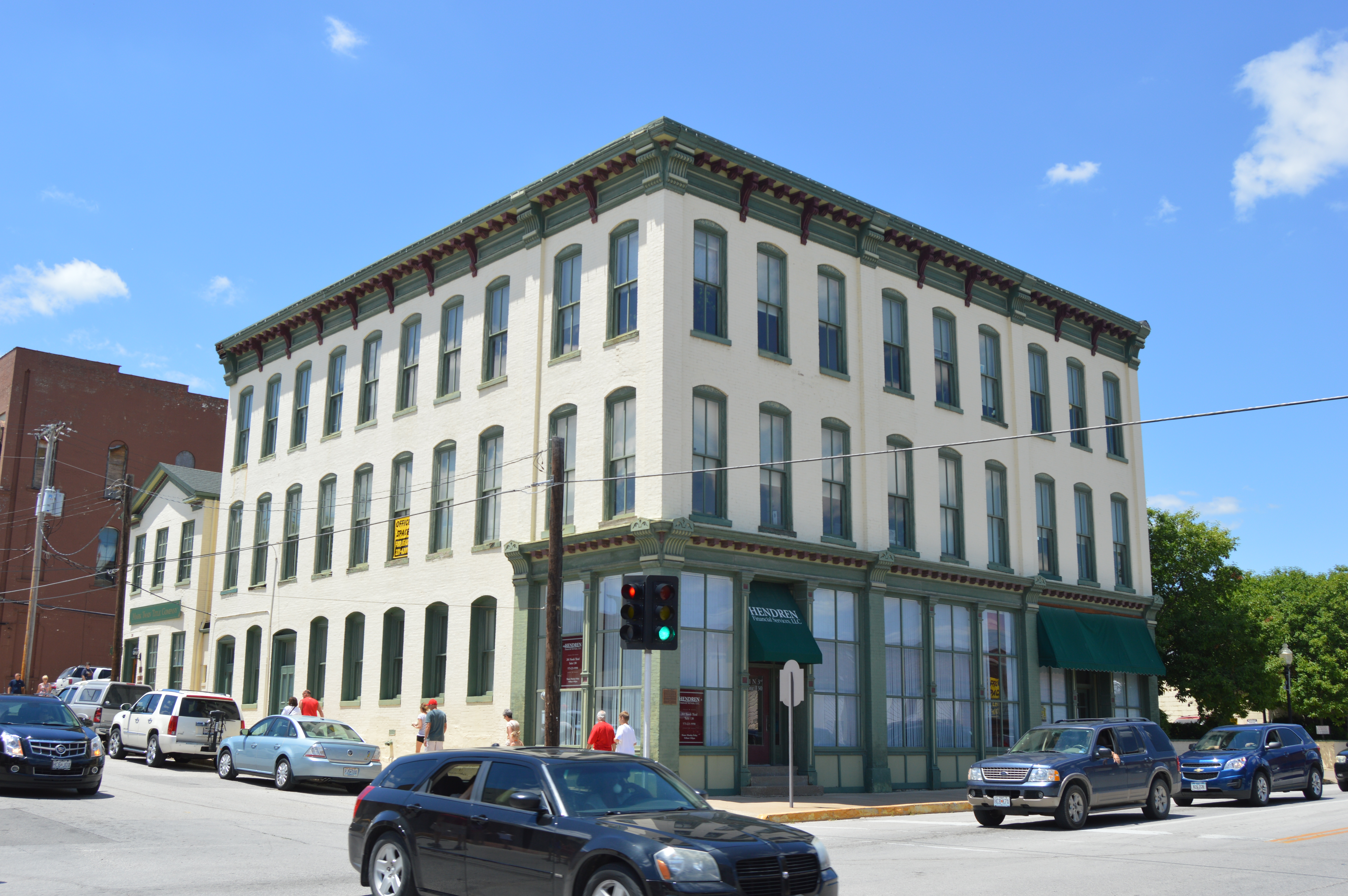
- Standard Printing Company, July 2014

- Location within Missouri Location within the United States
- Location: 301 N. Third St., Hannibal, Missouri
- Coordinates: 39°42′36″N 91°21′26″W
- Area: 0.1 acres (0.040 ha)
- Built: 1879
- Architect: Sullivan, D.W.
- Architectural style: Italianate
- MPS: Hannibal Central Business District MRA
- NRHP reference No.: 86002138
- Added to NRHP: August 1, 1986

Standard Printing Company, also known as the Hayward Grocery Company, is a historic commercial building located at Hannibal, Marion County, Missouri. It was built in 1879, and is a three-story, nine bay by ten bay, Italianate style brick structure. It features segmental arched windows, a lavish bracketed and modillioned cornice, and a storefront with intact cornice and iron pilasters.

It was added to the National Register of Historic Places in 1986.

== See also ==
- Benjamin Horr House
