= Benjamin Horr House =

Historic house in Missouri, United States

- U.S. National Register of Historic Places
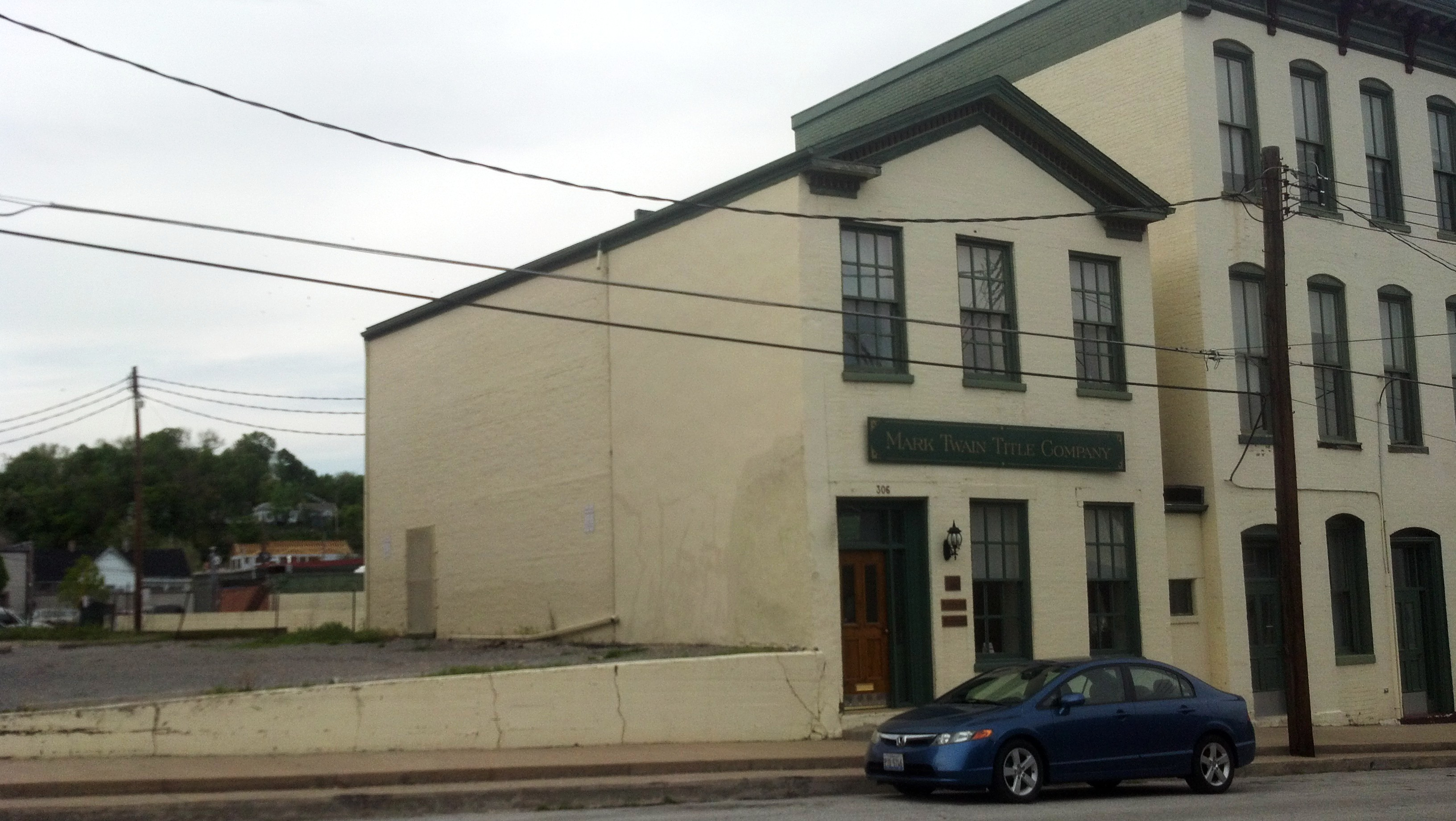
- Benjamin Horr House, September 2014

- Location within Missouri Location within the United States
- Location: 308 Center St., Hannibal, Missouri
- Coordinates: 39°42′36″N 91°21′27″W
- Area: 0.1 acres (0.040 ha)
- Built: c. 1855
- Architectural style: Greek Revival, Vernacular Greek Revival
- MPS: Hannibal Central Business District MRA
- NRHP reference No.: 86003587
- Added to NRHP: December 2, 1986

Benjamin Horr House, also known as the Standard Printing Company, is a historic home located at Hannibal, Marion County, Missouri. It was built about 1855, and is a two-story, vernacular Greek Revival style brick structure. It has a front gable roof with cornice. It is the earliest surviving building to have been used for education in Hannibal, having once housed a private school run by the family of one of Mark Twain's former schoolteachers.

It was added to the National Register of Historic Places in 1986.

== See also ==
- Standard Printing Company
