= Nelsonville =

Nelsonville can refer to several places in the United States:

- Nelsonville, Augusta Township, Michigan
- Nelsonville, Charlevoix County, Michigan
- Nelsonville, Missouri
- Nelsonville, New Jersey
- Nelsonville, New York
- Nelsonville, Ohio
- Nelsonville, Wisconsin, a village
- Nelsonville, Eau Claire County, Wisconsin, a ghost town
