= Masonic College =

Former Missouri college

Coordinates: 39.189867°N 93.876183°W

Masonic College was a higher education institution in the U.S. state of Missouri that was established by Freemasons in 1844 and operated until 1857.

== History ==
The Grand Lodge of Missouri opened the first Masonic College in Philadelphia, Missouri, beginning in spring of 1844. The institution was initially operated using property and facilities previously used by Marion College. However, the facilities in Philadelphia were insufficient, so the school administration soon sought a new location.

In 1847, the citizens of Lexington, Missouri subscribed $30,000 to relocate the college. On May 18, 1847, the Grand Lodge of Masons in Missouri laid the cornerstone of the Masonic College in Lexington. The solemn ceremony was conducted by Grand Master Joseph Foster. The building was erected and dedicated on July 11, 1848. The two-story brick building was 57 feet (17 m) wide by 80 feet (24 m) deep, with a basement of hewn stone. It was built in the Greek Revival style with four fluted Ionic columns. A 28 x 48-foot (15 m) chapel was in the basement.

The college was primarily for the benefit of the orphan children of deceased Masons, any children named Mason, and each member in the state was to pay a small per capita tax to support it. Facing severe financial shortfalls, the college closed in 1857.

During the American Civil War Battle of Lexington I, the building and grounds served as Federal headquarters for the forces under Colonel James A. Mulligan, who surrendered after a three-day siege, September 18–20, 1861. It was later abandoned by the Missouri State Guard, and the college was used by Federal troops for the remainder of the war. Soon after the conclusion of the war, the building and grounds were transferred to the state, and a military institute was opened, but that school failed as well. In 1871, the Masons transferred ownership to Central Female College, which later changed its name to Central College for Women. It operated from 1871 until 1925. The building burned in a fire on August 20, 1932.

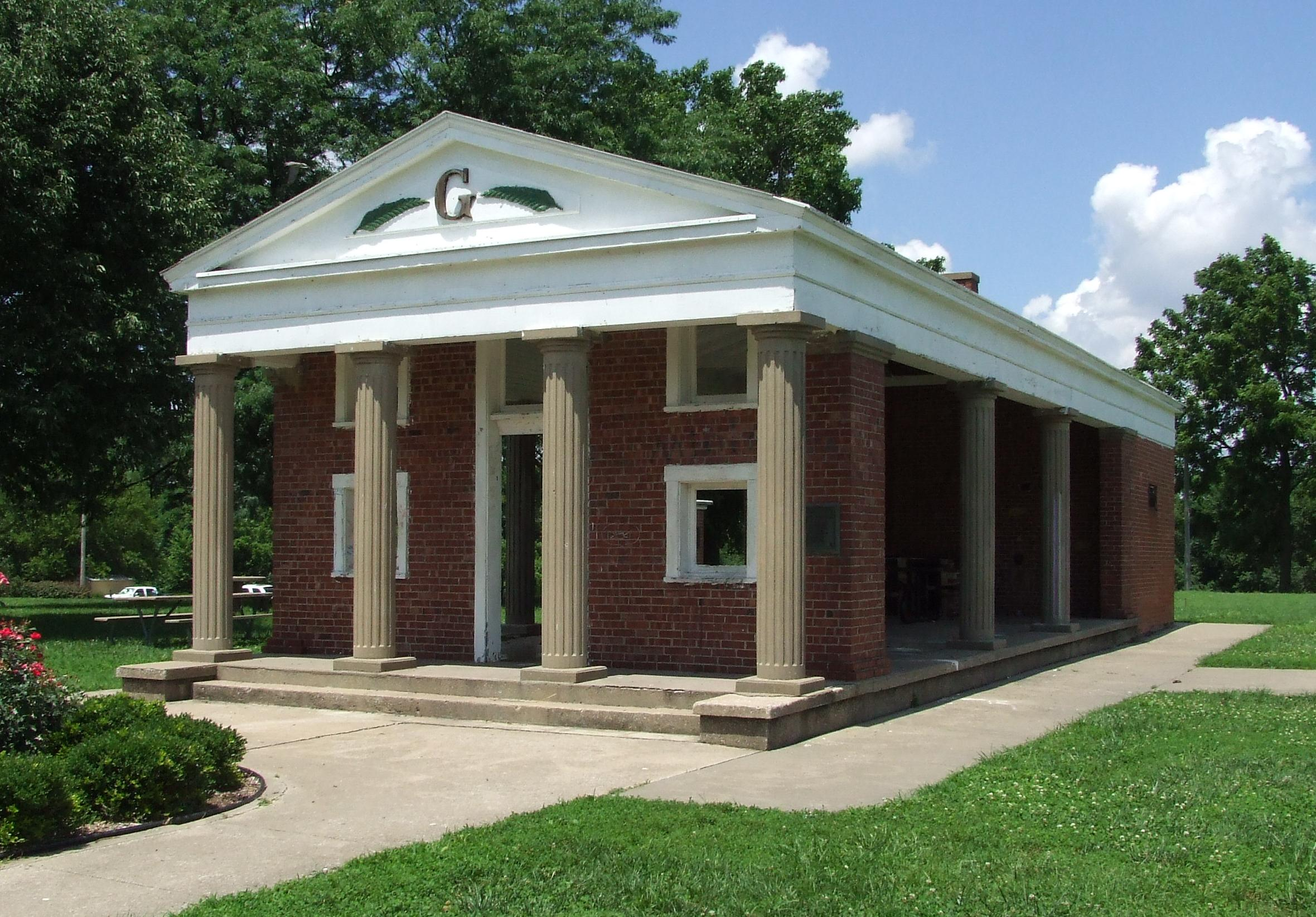
One-quarter-size replica building at the site of the original Masonic College

It is now the site of College Park in Lexington where, in 1934, the Grand Lodge of Missouri, Freemasons, erected a one-quarter scale replica of the original Masonic College building. The replica is surrounded by four columns, which stand at the four corners of the original structure. The columns individually commemorate the Battle of Lexington, the Central College for Women, the presidents of the college, and the students who attended the institution. The replica building, which still stands, was dedicated May 18, 1934, in a ceremony led by Grand Master Frank Clinton Barnhill.

== Notable alumni ==
- Senator Thomas Benton Catron
- Congressman Stephen Benton Elkins
- Kansas City businessman Richard H. Keith
- Missouri Governor John S. Marmaduke
- St. Louis lawyer Alonzo W. Slayback
- Montana Chief Justice William Y. Pemberton

== Presidents ==
- J. Worthington Smith, 1844–1847
- Adiel Sherwood, 1848–1849
- C.G. MacPherson, 1849–1850
- Ferdinand LaBoma Shaver, 1850–1853
- Archibald Patterson, 1853–1855
- William T. Davis, 1855–1859
