= Smileyville, Missouri =

Unincorporated community in Missouri, U.S.

Coordinates: 39°52′01″N 91°33′47″W

Smileyville is an unincorporated community in Marion County, in the U.S. state of Missouri.

== History ==
A post office called Smileyville was established in 1889, and remained in operation until 1901. The community has the name of one Mr. Smiley, a local merchant.
