= White Bear, Missouri =

Unincorporated community in Missouri, U.S.

Coordinates: 39°41′54″N 91°27′39″W

White Bear is an unincorporated community in Marion County, in the U.S. state of Missouri.

== History ==
Variant names were Bear Creek, Bear Creek Station, and Whiteledge. A post office called White Ledge was established in 1892, and remained in operation until 1904. White Bear was named for a product made by a local lime kiln.
