= Mungers, Missouri =

Unincorporated community in Missouri, U.S.

Coordinates: 39°45′20″N 91°24′09″W

Mungers is an unincorporated community in Marion County, in the U.S. state of Missouri.

The community has the name of William Munger, a railroad promoter.
