= Heather, Missouri =

Unincorporated community in Missouri, U.S.

Coordinates: 39°50′33″N 91°48′27″W

Heather is an unincorporated community in Marion County, in the U.S. state of Missouri.

== History ==
A post office called Heather was established in 1901, and remained in operation until 1906. The community has the name of H. Clay Heather, a state legislator.
