= Cave City, Missouri =

Unincorporated community in Missouri, U.S.

Coordinates: 39°41′22″N 91°19′55″W

Cave City is an unincorporated community in Marion County, in the U.S. state of Missouri.

The community was named for nearby Mark Twain Cave.
