= North River, Missouri =

Unincorporated community in Missouri

Coordinates: 39°50′38″N 91°29′23″W

North River is an unincorporated community in Marion County, in the U.S. state of Missouri.

== History ==
A post office called North River was established in 1870, and remained in operation until 1887. The community took its name from the nearby North River.
