= Bellville, Missouri =

Unincorporated community in Missouri, U.S.

Coordinates: 39°46′28″N 91°49′48″W

Bellville is an unincorporated community in Marion County, in the U.S. state of Missouri.

The community was named after D. W. Bell, a local merchant.
