= West Ely, Missouri =

Unincorporated community in Missouri, U.S.

Coordinates: 39°42′39″N 91°33′46″W

West Ely is an unincorporated community in Marion County, in the U.S. state of Missouri.

== History ==
A post office called West Ely was established in 1836, and remained in operation until 1908. Despite its name, the village lies east of Ely.
