= Cherry Dell, Missouri =

Extinct town in the American state of Missouri

Coordinates: 39.8900422°N 91.8359997°W

Cherry Dell is an extinct town in Marion County, in the U.S. state of Missouri.

A post office called Cherry Dell was established in 1879, and remained in operation until 1906. According to tradition, the community was named for a cherry tree near the original town site.
