= Hester, Missouri =

Unincorporated community in Missouri, U.S.

Coordinates: 39°54′39″N 91°37′37″W

Hester is an unincorporated community in northern Marion County, in the U.S. state of Missouri.

The community is on a ridge just west of the South Fabius River between Troublesome Creek to the south and Grassy Creek to the north. Adjacent communities are Maywood three miles to the north-northeast in Lewis County and Naomi, approximately four miles to the west.

The community had a post office from 1848 to 1904, which was in the home owned by Daniel Boone's daughter, Mrs. Elizabeth Coons. However, the origin of the name is uncertain.
