= Uva, Missouri =

- Unincorporated community
- Location within Missouri Location within the United States
- Coordinates: 39°43′52″N 91°27′12″W
- Country: United States
- State: Missouri
- County: Marion
- Elevation: 741 ft (226 m)
- Time zone: UTC-6 (Central (CST))
  - Summer (DST): UTC-5 (CDT)
- Area code: 573
- GNIS feature ID: 740404

Uva is an unincorporated community in Marion County, Missouri, United States.

An early variant name was "Mount Zion Community", after a nearby church of that name. A post office called Uva was established in 1898, and remained in operation until 1901. It is unknown why the name "Uva" was applied to this community.
