= Old Kingsport Presbyterian Church =

Historic church in Tennessee, United States

- U.S. National Register of Historic Places
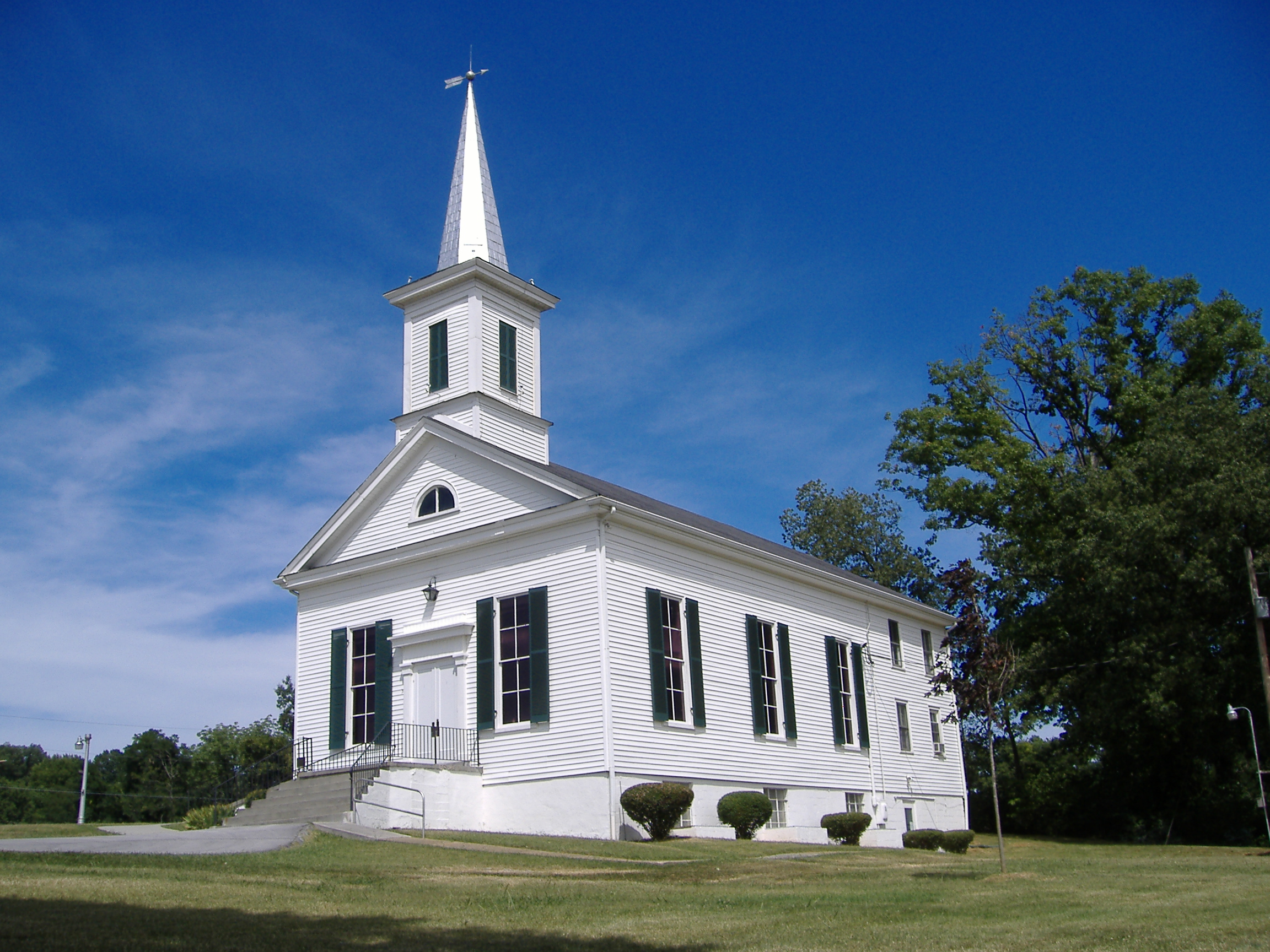
- Old Kingsport Presbyterian Church, 2008

- Location within Tennessee Location within the United States
- Location: Stone Dr. (Hwy. 11W) and Afton, Kingsport, Tennessee
- Coordinates: 36°33′22″N 82°35′32″W
- Area: 3 acres (1.2 ha)
- Built: 1845
- Architectural style: Greek Revival
- NRHP reference No.: 73001845
- Added to NRHP: October 02, 1973

Old Kingsport Presbyterian Church (formerly known as Boatyard Presbyterian Church and Kingsport Presbyterian Church) is a historic church located in Kingsport, Tennessee. The church was organized May 20, 1820 as the Boatyard Congregation. It is the oldest one of any denomination in the city of Kingsport. It is a member of the Presbyterian Church (U.S.A.).

== History ==
The congregation was organized in 1820. It originally met in a log structure located in the present-day Old Kingsport Presbyterian Church cemetery. The cemetery remains in use and contains several graves from the nineteenth century in its oldest section.

The first pastor was the Rev. Robert Glenn (1820–1826).

The Rev. Dr. Frederick A. Ross, owner of Rotherwood Mansion in Kingsport, was minister from 1826 to 1852. He did not receive compensation for his service. Under Ross' leadership, the church grew rapidly, quickly outgrowing its log building. Dr. Ross financed the construction of the current church building in 1845, with the labor of his own slaves; the building was dedicated on July 18, 1846. Ross also donated the church the large brass bell that still calls people to worship; the bell was made in West Troy, New York, by the famous Meneely Bell Foundry. The building is considered a fine example of Greek Revival architecture and is one of the oldest extant structures in Kingsport.

The American Civil War led to a period of decline in both Kingsport and the church. Membership slowly declined in the decades following the war, with a long series of pastors each serving for brief periods during this time (1865–1910).

Railroad tracks were laid just north of the church property in 1910, requiring the building to be moved a few yards south and rotated to face east; it had originally faced north.

When the City of Kingsport was created in 1917, most of the remaining members left the now-Old Kingsport Church in order to form the First Presbyterian Church in downtown Kingsport. Only five members remained on the roll, and the church served as a community center for the next two decades. The Sunday School remained active through the 1920s and 1930s, however.

The church was re-organized in June 1937 and began to slowly rebuild its membership. The first pastor of the re-organized church was Rev. Albert H. Mutschler. He oversaw the building's renovation, as well as the construction of three levels of Sunday School rooms attached to the back of the old sanctuary, as well as a basement. A fellowship hall was dug out under the sanctuary in 1950.

The church building was moved to its current location off of Stone Drive (U.S. Route 11W) in the summer of 1953 to land donated by Mrs. Octavia Patton.

The 1950s and 1960s were a time of quick growth; during this time, the church had a number of programs and a large number of youth and younger people. The church reached a peak of membership (190) in the early 1970s. Since that time, it has seen a declining membership total, as well as an aging congregation, both of which are trends experienced by mainstream denominations in general over the same time period.

The church was added to the National Register of Historic Places in 1973.

The Rev. David Hambrick served as interim pastor from 2003 to 2015. The current pastor is Mr. Jeff Morelock, who began his service on August 1, 2016. In recent years, the historic building has received a number of repairs and updates, plus quite a bit of beautification, inside and out. After nearly two centuries, the Old Kingsport congregation, though small, remains active in the Kingsport area.

== Sources ==
Rozendaal, John H. Old Kingsport Presbyterian Church. Kingsport, the church, 1982. 37 pp.
