= Newmarket, Marion County, Missouri =

Unincorporated community in Missouri, U.S.

Coordinates: 39°45′35″N 91°43′56″W

Newmarket (also spelled New Market) is a ghost town in Marion County, in the U.S. state of Missouri.

Newmarket was platted in 1836, and most likely was named after another place with the same name, although folk etymology maintains the community took its name from the second store (or "new market") established at the town site.
