= Withers Mill, Missouri =

Unincorporated community in Missouri, U.S.

Coordinates: 39°42′55″N 91°28′51″W

Withers Mill is an unincorporated community in Marion County, in the U.S. state of Missouri. The community is located on the northeast bank of Bear Creek approximately five miles west of Hannibal.

== History ==
A post office called Withers Mills was established in 1871, and remained in operation until 1934. The community took its name from a nearby mill, which in turn was named for its proprietor.
