= Warren, Missouri =

Unincorporated community in Missouri, U.S.

Warren
- unincorporated community
- Location within Missouri and the United States Warren (the United States)
- Coordinates: 39°46′25″N 91°45′24″W
- Country: United States
- State: Missouri
- County: Marion
- Platted: 1854
- Named for: Warren Township
- Time zone: UTC−6 (Central)
  - Summer (DST): UTC−5 (CDT)

Warren is an unincorporated community in Marion County, in the U.S. state of Missouri.

== History ==
Warren was platted in 1854, and named for its location within Warren Township. A post office called Warren was established in 1839, and remained in operation until 1953.
