= Frederick Augustus Ross =

American Presbyterian minister (1796-1883)

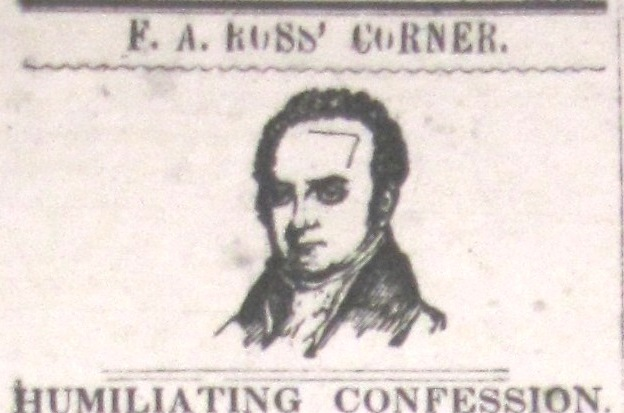
Heading for "F.A. Ross' Corner," a series in the William Gannaway Brownlow's Jonesborough Whig that attacked Presbyterian minister Frederick Augustus Ross.

Frederick Augustus Ross (December 25, 1796 – April 13, 1883) was a Presbyterian New School clergyman in both Kingsport, Tennessee, and Huntsville, Alabama, slave owner, publisher and pro-slavery author of the book Slavery As Ordained of God (1857).

American singer Diana Ross's great-grandfather, Frederick Ross, was born on the Rotherwood plantation.

== Early life ==
Ross was born in Cumberland County, Virginia, the son of David Ross, a wealthy businessman in Richmond who had emigrated from Scotland in the mid-18th century. Ross was educated at Dickinson College in Carlisle, Pennsylvania, with the class of 1815, although he did not graduate with his class.

== Ministry ==
During 1818, Ross entered into the Presbyterian ministry, emancipated his slaves, and then moved to Kingsport, Tennessee, where he had his massive Rotherwood mansion constructed on the Netherland Inn Road. Ross had his daughter, Rowena, educated at boarding schools in the northern United States.

Ross became pastor of Old Kingsport Presbyterian Church in 1826, and in 1828 he briefly labored as an evangelist in Kentucky and Ohio. During the eruption of the Old School–New School controversy division of the Presbyterian general assembly in 1837 and 1838, Ross aligned himself with the New School branch, and he remained as pastor of the Old Kingsport Presbyterian Church until 1852. Beginning in 1855, Ross became pastor of the First Presbyterian Church in Huntsville, Alabama, holding this charge until 1875 and continuing as pastor emeritus until his death in 1883.

== Author, controversy ==
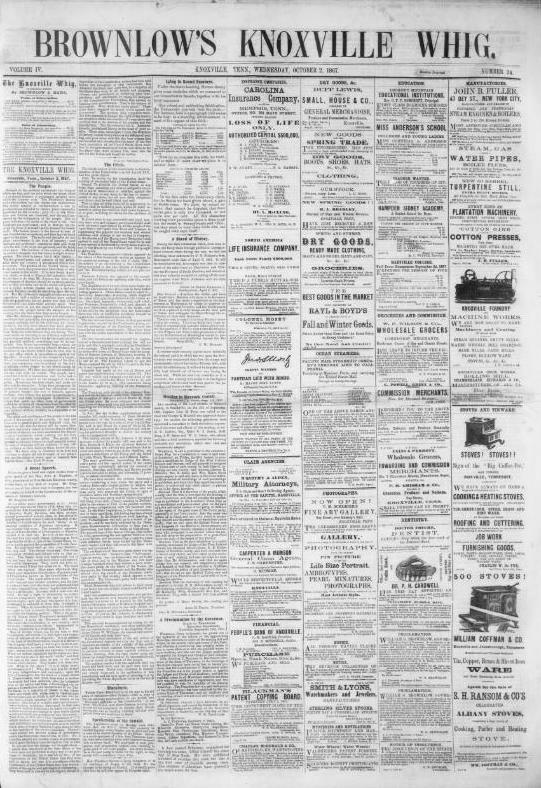
Browlow's Knoxville Whig weekly broadsheet. Brownlow had previously published variations of his Whig newspapers in both Elizabethton and Jonesborough.

Together with James Gallaher and David Nelson, Ross edited a monthly publication entitled The Calvinistic Magazine, that was first founded in 1826 and continued in operation through 1832. In the late 1840s, Ross began quarreling with Methodist minister and Whig newspaper publisher William Gannaway Brownlow. Ross had earlier "declared war" on Methodism in Calvinist Magazine. Although distracted by internecine Old School–New School controversy within the Presbyterian church for nearly a decade, Ross resurrected the Calvinist Magazine in 1845. Ross argued that the Methodist Church was despotic, comparing it to a "great iron wheel" that would crush American liberty, and he went on to state that most Methodists were descended from Revolutionary War Loyalists and accused its founder John Wesley of believing in ghosts and witches.

Brownlow initially responded to Ross with a running column, "F.A. Ross' Corner," in the Jonesborough Whig. In 1847, he launched a separate paper, the Jonesborough Quarterly Review, which was dedicated to refuting Ross's attacks, and embarked on a speaking tour that summer. Brownlow argued that while it was common in Wesley's time for people to believe in ghosts, he provided evidence that many Presbyterian ministers still believed in such things. He derided Ross as a "habitual adulterer" and the son of a slave and accused his relatives of stealing and committing indecent acts (Ross's son responded to the latter charge with a death threat). This quarrel between the two men continued until Brownlow moved his newspaper to Knoxville, Tennessee, in 1849.

In 1857 Ross authored the book Slavery As Ordained of God, written in response to the 1852 book Uncle Tom's Cabin by Harriet Beecher Stowe. Abraham Lincoln read the book and found in Ross's interpretation of the divine will pertaining to the national question of slavery as material for a telling passage as to how slavery advocates and owners themselves benefit from slavery within the 1858 Lincoln–Douglas debates.
