= Mark, Missouri =

Extinct town in the American state of Missouri

Coordinates: 39°53′17″N 91°27′49″W

Mark is an extinct town in Marion County, in the U.S. state of Missouri. The GNIS classifies it as a populated place.

A post office called Mark was established in 1914, and remained in operation until 1927. The community had the name of Clayton Mark, an investor in the site. Variant names were "Dunsford" and "Moody".
