= Lamb, Missouri =

Extinct town in the American state of Missouri

Coordinates: 39°44′28″N 91°23′13″W

Lamb is an extinct town in Marion County, in the U.S. state of Missouri. The GNIS classifies it as a populated place.

The community was named after A. W. Lamb, a railroad official.
