= Helton, Missouri =

Unincorporated community in Missouri, U.S.

Coordinates: 39°46′29″N 91°25′17″W

Helton is an unincorporated community in Marion County, in the U.S. state of Missouri.

== History ==
A variant name was "Helton Station". A post office called Helton Station was established in 1878, and remained in operation until 1880. The community was named after Judge Helton, the original owner of the town site.
