= Barkley, Missouri =

Unincorporated community in Missouri, U.S.

Coordinates: 39°44′11″N 91°30′35″W

Barkley is an unincorporated community in Marion County, in the U.S. state of Missouri.

The community has the name of Levi Barkley, a pioneer citizen.
