= Robert Rex Seeber Jr. =

American scientist (1910–1969)

Robert Rex Seeber Jr. (1910-1969), an inventor at IBM, co-invented the Selective Sequence Electronic Calculator (SSEC). He was born in Detroit, Michigan, graduated with an A.B. from Harvard University in 1932. He died in La Jolla, California. His primary research contributions were in computer systems design, and associative memories and processors.

As a mathematician, Seeber began his career as section head, actuarial, at the John Hancock Mutual Life Insurance Co., from 1932-42. From 1942-45, he did civilian research on submarine, anti-submarine, air, and anti-air operations for the U.S. Navy. He also performed mathematical computing for the Navy.

The balance of Seeber's professional life was as a computer architect and inventor at International Business Machines Corp. from 1945-68. Seeber's first project at IBM was the SSEC. He was an advocate of modifiable instruction sets. For this machine was developed the stored-program concept, the basis of modern computing machines. As a senior staff member of the Department of Pure Science for IBM, he was responsible for supervision of the computation and educational activities at the Watson Laboratory.

Seeber was also the inventor of the "Wordwriter" an IBM Selectric typewriter with a memory capable of storing 42 eighteen-character words and phrases, selected by the operator. Stored words were selected by pressing a foot pedal at the same time as striking the letter to which the word is keyed. The machine featured optional automatic capitalization and hyphenation.

== Partial list of awards ==
- Naval Ordnance development award, 1944.
- Division of War reserves award, Columbia University, 1944.
- Office of Scientific Research and Development, Certificate of Merit, 1945.
