= Ely, Missouri =

Unincorporated community in Missouri, U.S.

Coordinates: 39°41′30″N 91°38′00″W

Ely is an unincorporated community in Marion County, in the U.S. state of Missouri.

== History ==
Ely had its start in the late 1850s when the railroad was extended to that point. The community was named for Dr. Ezra Stiles Ely, a reverend from Pennsylvania. A post office called Ely Station was established in 1874, the name was changed to Ely in 1883, and the post office closed in 1937.
