= Little Union, Missouri =

Unincorporated community in Missouri, U.S.

Coordinates: 39°49′51″N 91°39′16″W

Little Union is an unincorporated community in Marion County, in the U.S. state of Missouri.

== History ==
A post office Little Union was established in 1876, and remained in operation until 1886. The community took its name from a nearby church of the same name.
