= Ezra Stiles Ely =

American pastor (1786–1861)

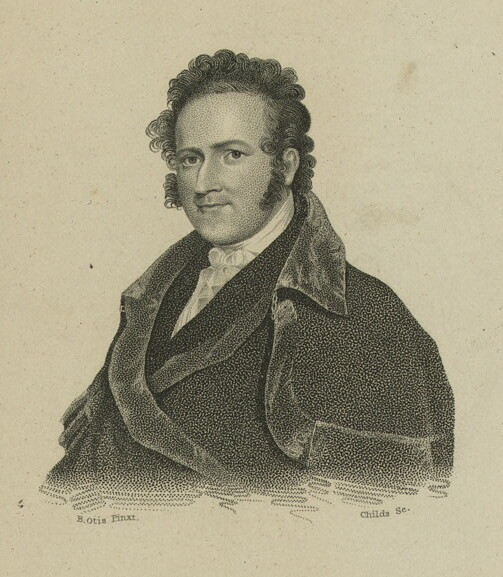
- Ezra Stiles Ely
- Born: June 13, 1786; Lebanon, Connecticut
- Died: June 17, 1861 (aged 75); Philadelphia, Pennsylvania

Ezra Stiles Ely (June 13, 1786 – June 17, 1861) was an American Presbyterian minister during the Second Great Awakening. He was the pastor at the historic Pine Street Church in Philadelphia, serving there for more than twenty years. Based on his Christian beliefs, he felt it was his moral duty to help and give council to the poor.

== Biography ==
Ezra Stiles Ely was the son of Rev. Zebulon Ely, and was born in Lebanon, Connecticut in 1786. In 1803, he graduated from Yale at the age of seventeen and was licensed to preach a year later. In October 1806, he was settled as pastor of the church in Colchester, Connecticut (Westchester parish). In 1810, he left to begin his duties as the Stated Preacher of the New York Almshouse under the sponsorship of the Presbytery of New York, one of the largest churches in the city at the time. He served the Almshouse in the years 1811 and 1813, and wrote two journals documenting his experience.

In 1814 he was called to the pastorate of the Pine Street Church in Philadelphia, where he continued over twenty years. As a friend and confidant of Andrew Jackson, Ely advocated for a "Christian Party" during the 1820s. Around 1834, he began establishing a College and Theological Seminary in Marion County, Missouri, known as Marion College. The financial reverses of 1837 frustrated the undertaking and created trouble for Ely, and he was arrested twice for land deals gone awry, and Curtis Dahl documented Ely's advising role with a political sex scandal (the notorious Peggy Eaton Affair/Petticoat Affair). In 1844, he entered on pastoral duties in the First Presbyterian Church in New London Township, Pennsylvania, and continued his labors until 1851, when he had a stroke, and was paralyzed.

He was a quick thinker, a gifted speaker, and an imaginative writer. For several years, he edited a religious paper named, The Philadelphian. He was the author of The Journal of the Stated Preacher to the Hospital and Almshouse, in the City of New-York, for the Year of Our Lord 1811, otherwise known as Visits of Mercy, and, of Conversations on the Science of the Human Mind (Phil. 1819). In 1828, he assisted in publishing a Collateral Bible, or Key to the Holy Scriptures, and he edited his father's memoir.

He received a Doctor of Divinity degree from Washington College in Tennessee. He was twice married and two of his children survived him. He died in Philadelphia, Pa., June 17, 1861, aged 75.

== Ely & the Poor ==
Ely serves as an example of how early nineteenth century American Christian ministers viewed the problem of urban poverty.

Ely, through his work in the New York Almshouse (1811, 1813), was credited as being "one of the first in America to face openly the problem of prostitution and to deal sympathetically with its victims." His sympathy for the poor he served, however, was reflected in lines such as: asking if it would be lawful "to confine in work-houses some of the clamorous and diseased persons, who are a nuisance to the city?" He also called for the banning of the procreation of the poor by separating families in the Almshouse: "No sort of connexion [sic] should exist between men, women, and children. This would prevent the multiplication of many paupers." Ely's anti-procreation solution did not abate in time. Two years later he wrote how poor children were "born and educated in the Almshouse for the devil" and that "the evil will extend, and the miserable will procreate children of misery" unless the genders were separated.".

Ely's ideology regarding the poor was rooted in the concept of Divine Benevolence. This belief entailed that the problem of poverty was a fact of nature. Poverty, in this view, has always been a problem and always will be. The poverty-stricken were believed to be in their state, not due to external forces such as economics, war, or famine, but because they have made poor life choices, or are too insufficient as humans to be prosperous. This is an important concept to consider as events such as the War of 1812, trade embargoes, and numerous market fluctuations during the era had severe, and negative consequences, on the problem of poverty. Divine Benevolence held that Christians that were better off serving the poor with compassion and direction towards more godly living and away from the dangers of vice. Direct assistance, in the form of food, clothing, or fuel for fire, was viewed as an enabling agent, and was therefore discouraged. Although Ely described his written work about the poor as: "My journal is of necessity the record of wretchedness," he nevertheless maintained a positive outlook regarding his ministerial role. He described himself as a "guide-post... besides a public road, multitudes pass him; he points them to a path that leads to a better country, and they are soon out of sight."

== Works ==
- A Sermon Delivered by Ezra Stiles Ely, on the First Sabbath after His Ordination. Hartford: Lincoln and Gleason (1806)
- A Sermon for the Rich to Buy that They May Benefit Themselves and the Poor (1810)
- A Contrast Between Calvinism and Hopkinsianism (1811)
- The Journal of the Stated Preacher to the Hospital and Almshouse, in the City of New-York, for the Year of Our Lord 1811. New York: Whiting and Watson (1812)
- The Second Journal of the Stated Preacher to the Hospital and Almshouse, in the City of New-York, for a Part of the Year of Our Lord 1813. Philadelphia: M. Carey (1815)
- Conversations on the Science of the Human Mind (1819)
- A Synopsis of Didactic Theology (1822)
- A Discussion of the Conjoint Question: is the Doctrine of Endless Punishment Taught in the Bible? Or Does the Bible Teach the Doctrine of the Final Holiness and Happiness of All Mankind? (1857)

== See also ==
- Thomas Brainerd – Minister called by Ely to be his successor at the Old Pine Street Church
