= Benbow (surname) =

Benbow is a surname. Notable people with the surname include:

- Amos E. Benbow (1850–1922), American politician
- Camilla Benbow, educational psychologist
- Edwin Benbow (1895–1918), Royal Flying Corps ace
- John Benbow (1653–1702), Royal Navy admiral
- Katie Benbow, singer
- Kay Benbow (1961–2024), British broadcasting executive
- Kia Michelle Benbow (born 1990), American fine artist
- Len Benbow (1876–1946), English footballer with Nottingham Forest and Stoke
- Leon Benbow (born 1950), American retired basketball player
- Robert Benbow (1933–2014), British army officer
- Steve Benbow (1931–2006), British folk guitarist, singer and music director
- Warren Benbow (1954–2024), American drummer
- William Benbow (1784 – c. 1841), English nonconformist preacher, pamphleteer, pornographer, publisher and reformer
