= Grand Lodge of Missouri =

Freemasonry organization in U.S. state

Coordinates: 39°1′7.4″N 92°18′31.34″W

- Established: 1821
- Location: USA
- Region served: Missouri
- Website: momason.org

The Grand Lodge of Missouri is one of two statewide organizations, along with a Prince Hall Affiliated grand lodge, that oversee Masonic lodges in the state of Missouri. It was established on April 21, 1821. It is located in Columbia, Missouri.

== History ==
The first Lodge in Missouri was created by residents of Ste. Genevieve, Missouri. The charter was issued on November 14, 1807 on a warrant from the Grand Lodge of Pennsylvania for the Louisiana Lodge No. 109, to be held in St. Genevieve, Territory of Louisiana with the following officers: Aaron Elliott, Master; Andrew Henry, Senior Warden; and George Bullitt, Junior Warden.

On September 15, 1808, the Grand Lodge of Pennsylvania granted a warrant to Meriwether Lewis (leader of the Lewis and Clark Expedition, and the first governor of the Territory of Louisiana), Master, Thomas Fiveash Riddick, Senior Warden, and Rufus Easton, Junior Warden, for Saint Louis Lodge No. 111. This Lodge was constituted November 8, 1808, by Otho Shrader under dispensation dated September 16, 1808.

Later, the Grand Lodge of Tennessee granted charters to three Lodges in Missouri Territory: Missouri Lodge No. 12, in St. Louis, October 8, 1816, Joachim Lodge No. 25, at Herculaneum, October 5, 1819, and St. Charles Lodge No. 28, at St. Charles, October 5, 1819.

In 1820 Unity Lodge was established at Jackson under dispensation from the Grand Lodge of Indiana. It was in existence when the Grand Lodge of Missouri was organized, and was rechartered by it as Unity Lodge No. 6.

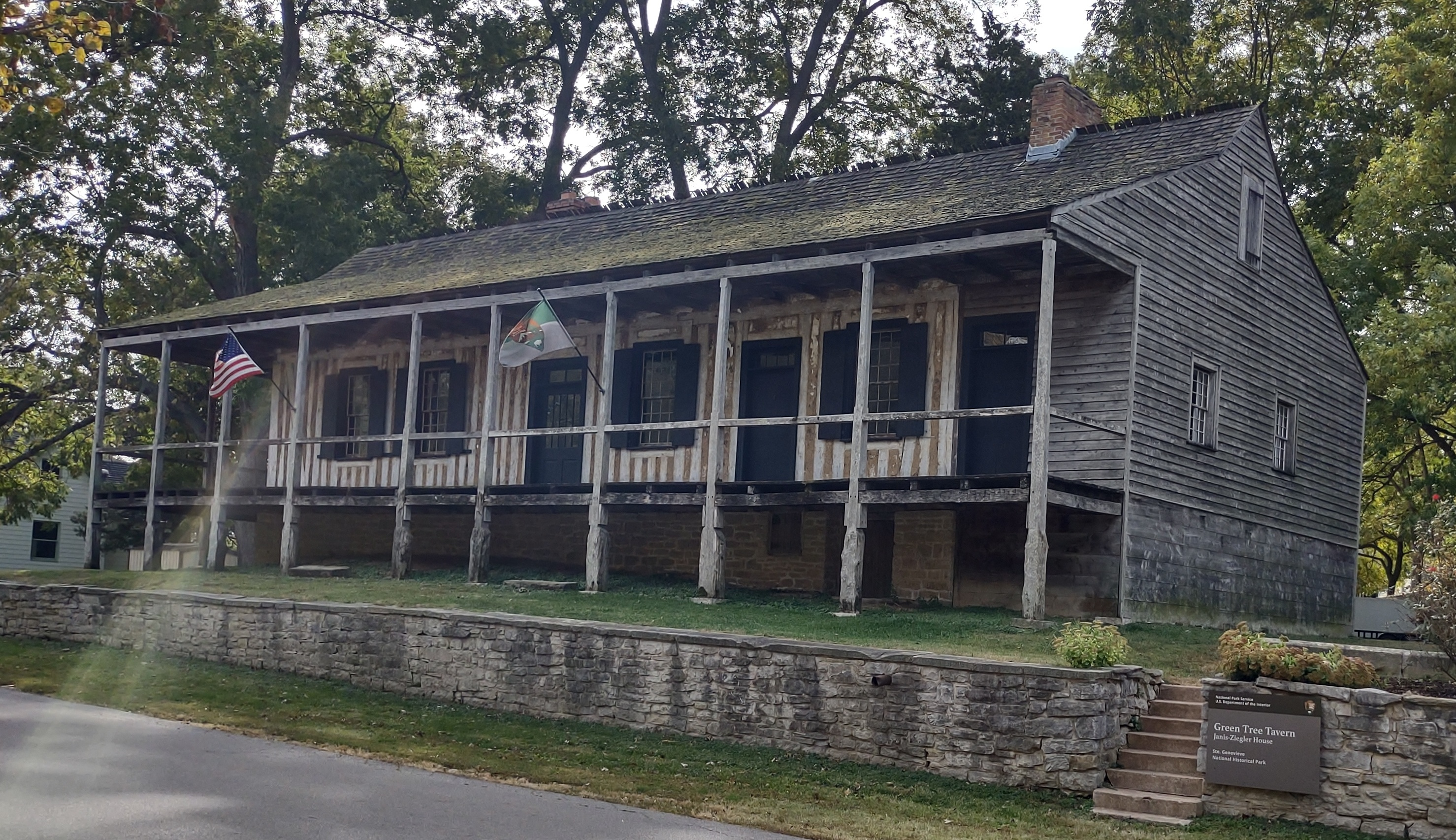
The first lodge in Missouri was founded inside the Green Tree Tavern in Ste. Genevieve

On February 22, 1821, representatives from Missouri Lodge No. 12, Joachim Lodge No. 25, and St. Charles Lodge No. 28, assembled in the hall of Missouri Lodge and resolved to organize a grand Lodge for the State of Missouri. The Grand Lodge was organized April 21, 1821, and a constitution and by-laws were adopted.

The Grand Lodge of Free and Accepted Ancient Masons of the State of Missouri was incorporated by act of the General Assembly of Missouri February 17, 1843. An amendment to this act, repealing its requirement of operation of a college, was approved February 11, 1861. By act of the General Assembly approved February 13, 1864, certain named members of the"Grand Lodge of the State of Missouri of Free and Accepted Ancient Masons were incorporated as "The Grand Lodge of the State of Missouri of Free and Accepted Ancient Masons." By act of the General Assembly approved March 22, 1870, the Grand Lodge of Ancient, Free and Accepted Masons of the State of Missouri was, among other things, "authorized to own property of any value not exceeding $300,000.00." By decree of the Circuit Court of the City of Saint Louis entered November 18, 1933, the corporate names used in these legislative acts were replaced by "\The Grand Lodge of Ancient, Free and Accepted Masons of the State of Missouri, which is now the correct corporate name of the Grand Lodge, and the powers of the corporation, especially with reference to the Masonic Home and to the holding of property, were greatly amplified.

The present Constitution was adopted May 28, 1866, with a Code of By-Laws, which has been amended through the years. The By-Laws are subject to change by the action of the Grand Lodge members at the annual communication (meeting) of the Grand Lodge.

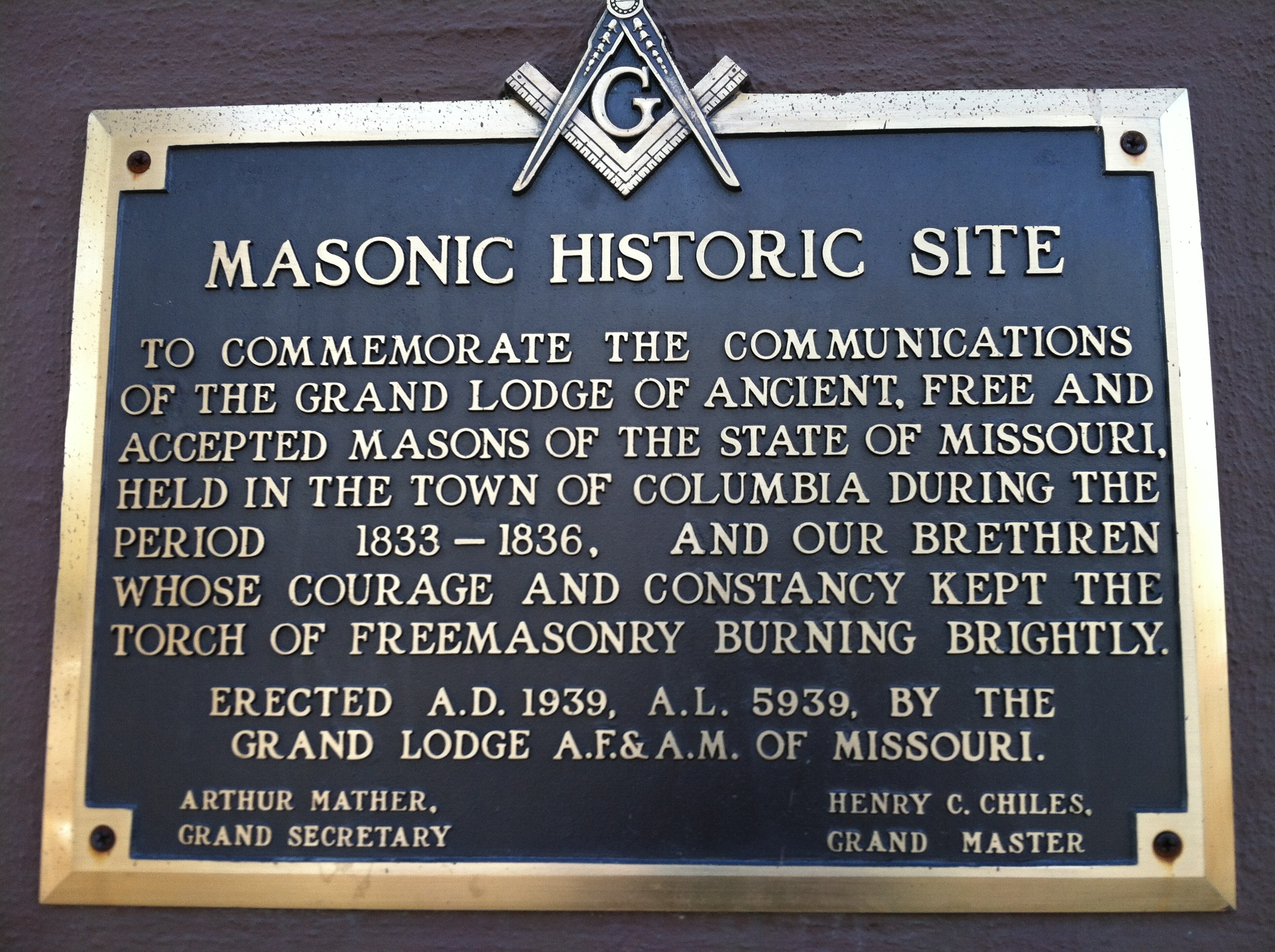
Grand Lodge Historical marker in Columbia, Missouri

The Grand Lodge operated Masonic College in Lexington, Missouri during the middle part of the 19th century.

== Missouri Freemasons ==
President Harry Truman was a prominent Missouri mason; his apron is on display at the Grand Lodge. The Father of Texas Stephen F. Austin was a member of Louisiana Lodge No. 109 in St. Genevieve, MO. Author Mark Twain was affiliated with Polar Star Lodge Number 79 in St. Louis Missouri.
