= Benbow, Missouri =

Unincorporated community in Missouri, U.S.

Coordinates: 39°54′54″N 91°44′39″W

Benbow is an unincorporated community in Marion County, in the U.S. state of Missouri.

== History ==
Benbow was originally called Midway, and under the latter name was laid out in 1862. A post office called Benbow was established in 1865, and remained in operation until 1906. The identity of namesake Benbow has been lost.
