= Emerson, Missouri =

Unincorporated community in Missouri, U.S.

Coordinates: 39°53′22″N 91°41′52″W

Emerson is an unincorporated community in northwest Marion County, in the U.S. state of Missouri. The community is located on Missouri Route M approximately ten miles northwest of Palmyra, on a ridge north of the South Fabius River.

The community was originally named Houston for Sam Houston when established in 1837 and had a post office in 1853. The name was changed to Emerson sometime between 1858 and 1861 for one John Emerson who was an original settler in the area. It had a post office as Emerson from 1867 to 1904.
