= Seebers Branch =

Stream in the American state of Missouri

Coordinates: 39.962264°N 91.919337°W

Seebers Branch is a stream in Knox and Lewis Counties in the U.S. state of Missouri.

Seebers Branch has the name of the Seeber family, original owners of the site.

== See also ==
- List of rivers of Missouri
