= Steffenville, Missouri =

Unincorporated community in Missouri, U.S.

Coordinates: 39°58′14″N 91°52′56″W

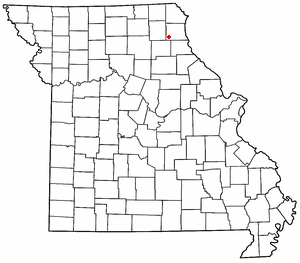

Steffenville is an unincorporated community in southwestern Lewis County, Missouri, United States. It is located on Missouri Supplemental Route D, approximately 22 miles southwest of Canton. The community is part of the Quincy, IL–MO Micropolitan Statistical Area.

A post office called Steffenville was established in 1872, and remained in operation until 1988. Steffenville was named for Henry Steffens, a pioneer settler. The Steffens family was the original owner of the town site.

== Climate ==
According to the Köppen Climate Classification system, Steffenville has a humid subtropical climate, abbreviated "Cfa" on climate maps. The hottest temperature recorded in Steffenville was 115 °F (46.1 °C) on July 15, 1936, while the coldest temperature recorded was −28 °F (−33.3 °C) on February 13, 1905.

Climate data for Steffenville, Missouri, 1991–2020 normals, extremes 1897–present
Month	Jan	Feb	Mar	Apr	May	Jun	Jul	Aug	Sep	Oct	Nov	Dec	Year
Record high °F (°C)	74 (23)	80 (27)	90 (32)	94 (34)	102 (39)	107 (42)	115 (46)	113 (45)	109 (43)	98 (37)	85 (29)	74 (23)	115 (46)
Mean maximum °F (°C)	58.2 (14.6)	64.3 (17.9)	75.3 (24.1)	82.7 (28.2)	87.7 (30.9)	92.4 (33.6)	96.1 (35.6)	96.1 (35.6)	91.8 (33.2)	84.9 (29.4)	72.0 (22.2)	61.9 (16.6)	97.9 (36.6)
Mean daily maximum °F (°C)	34.5 (1.4)	39.5 (4.2)	52.1 (11.2)	64.1 (17.8)	73.2 (22.9)	81.9 (27.7)	85.7 (29.8)	84.3 (29.1)	77.7 (25.4)	65.6 (18.7)	50.9 (10.5)	38.6 (3.7)	62.3 (16.9)
Daily mean °F (°C)	26.1 (−3.3)	30.5 (−0.8)	41.8 (5.4)	53.0 (11.7)	63.0 (17.2)	72.1 (22.3)	75.6 (24.2)	73.9 (23.3)	66.3 (19.1)	54.9 (12.7)	41.8 (5.4)	30.9 (−0.6)	52.5 (11.4)
Mean daily minimum °F (°C)	17.8 (−7.9)	21.5 (−5.8)	31.5 (−0.3)	42.0 (5.6)	52.8 (11.6)	62.2 (16.8)	65.5 (18.6)	63.5 (17.5)	55.0 (12.8)	44.1 (6.7)	32.6 (0.3)	23.3 (−4.8)	42.7 (5.9)
Mean minimum °F (°C)	−4.1 (−20.1)	0.8 (−17.3)	11.5 (−11.4)	26.2 (−3.2)	38.1 (3.4)	50.7 (10.4)	55.9 (13.3)	53.9 (12.2)	39.8 (4.3)	27.8 (−2.3)	15.6 (−9.1)	2.9 (−16.2)	−7.8 (−22.1)
Record low °F (°C)	−24 (−31)	−28 (−33)	−11 (−24)	5 (−15)	26 (−3)	38 (3)	42 (6)	38 (3)	24 (−4)	7 (−14)	−10 (−23)	−26 (−32)	−28 (−33)
Average precipitation inches (mm)	1.70 (43)	1.85 (47)	2.49 (63)	4.01 (102)	5.06 (129)	4.84 (123)	3.98 (101)	3.88 (99)	3.73 (95)	3.41 (87)	2.61 (66)	1.91 (49)	39.47 (1,004)
Average snowfall inches (cm)	5.8 (15)	4.1 (10)	2.1 (5.3)	0.7 (1.8)	0.0 (0.0)	0.0 (0.0)	0.0 (0.0)	0.0 (0.0)	0.0 (0.0)	0.1 (0.25)	1.0 (2.5)	4.0 (10)	17.8 (44.85)
Average extreme snow depth inches (cm)	3.6 (9.1)	2.7 (6.9)	1.6 (4.1)	0.4 (1.0)	0.0 (0.0)	0.0 (0.0)	0.0 (0.0)	0.0 (0.0)	0.0 (0.0)	0.1 (0.25)	0.5 (1.3)	2.4 (6.1)	5.7 (14)
Average precipitation days (≥ 0.01 in)	6.6	6.6	8.0	10.7	11.5	9.9	9.0	8.3	6.6	7.7	6.9	6.9	98.7
Average snowy days (≥ 0.1 in)	3.9	3.0	1.5	0.4	0.0	0.0	0.0	0.0	0.0	0.1	0.6	2.9	12.4
Source 1: NOAA
Source 2: National Weather Service
