= James Gallaher =

James Gallaher (1792 – 1853), a Presbyterian, was the Chaplain of the United States House of Representatives in 1852.

Religious titles
Preceded by Littleton F. Morgan	40th US House Chaplain; December 6, 1852 – December 5, 1853	Succeeded by William Henry Milburn
