= Nelsonville, Missouri =

Unincorporated community in Missouri, U.S.

Coordinates: 39°55′34″N 91°47′48″W

Nelsonville is an unincorporated community in Marion County, in the U.S. state of Missouri.

== History ==
A post office called Nelsonville was established in 1851, and closed at a later date. The community has the name of one Mr. Nelson, a first settler.
