= Philadelphia, Missouri =

Unincorporated community in Missouri

- Census-designated place
- Location within Missouri Location within the United States
- Coordinates: 39°50′19″N 91°44′21″W
- Country: United States
- State: Missouri
- County: Marion

Area
  - Total: 0.76 sq mi (1.96 km^{2})
  - Land: 0.76 sq mi (1.96 km^{2})
  - Water: 0 sq mi (0.00 km^{2})
- Elevation: 709 ft (216 m)

Population (2020)
  - Total: 206
  - Density: 270/sq mi (105/km^{2})
- ZIP code: 63463
- Area code: 573
- FIPS code: 29-57350
- GNIS feature ID: 2806414

Philadelphia is an unincorporated community and census-designated place in western Marion County, Missouri, United States. It is located 12 miles (19 km) west of Palmyra on Missouri Route 168. The community is part of the Hannibal Micropolitan Statistical Area.

Philadelphia was platted in 1835. The community was named after Philadelphia, Pennsylvania. A post office called Philadelphia has been in operation since 1847.

Philadelphia was first listed as a census-designated place for the 2020 census, at which time it had a population of 206.

== Geography ==
Philadelphia is in western Marion County, 12 miles (19 km) west of Palmyra, the county seat, 16 miles (26 km) north of Monroe City, 18 miles (29 km) east of Shelbyville, and 13 miles (21 km) south of Ewing. Hannibal, the largest city in Marion County, is 25 miles (40 km) to the southeast on the Mississippi River.

According to the U.S. Census Bureau, the Philadelphia CDP has an area of 0.76 square miles (1.97 km^{2}), all land. The community drains north to a tributary of the South Fabius River and south to a tributary of the North River. Both rivers flow east to the Mississippi.

== Demographics ==
Historical population
Census	Pop.	Note	%±
2020	206		—
U.S. Decennial Census

Philadelphia first appeared as a census designated place in the 2020 U.S. census.
