= Marion County, Missouri =

County in Missouri, United States

- County
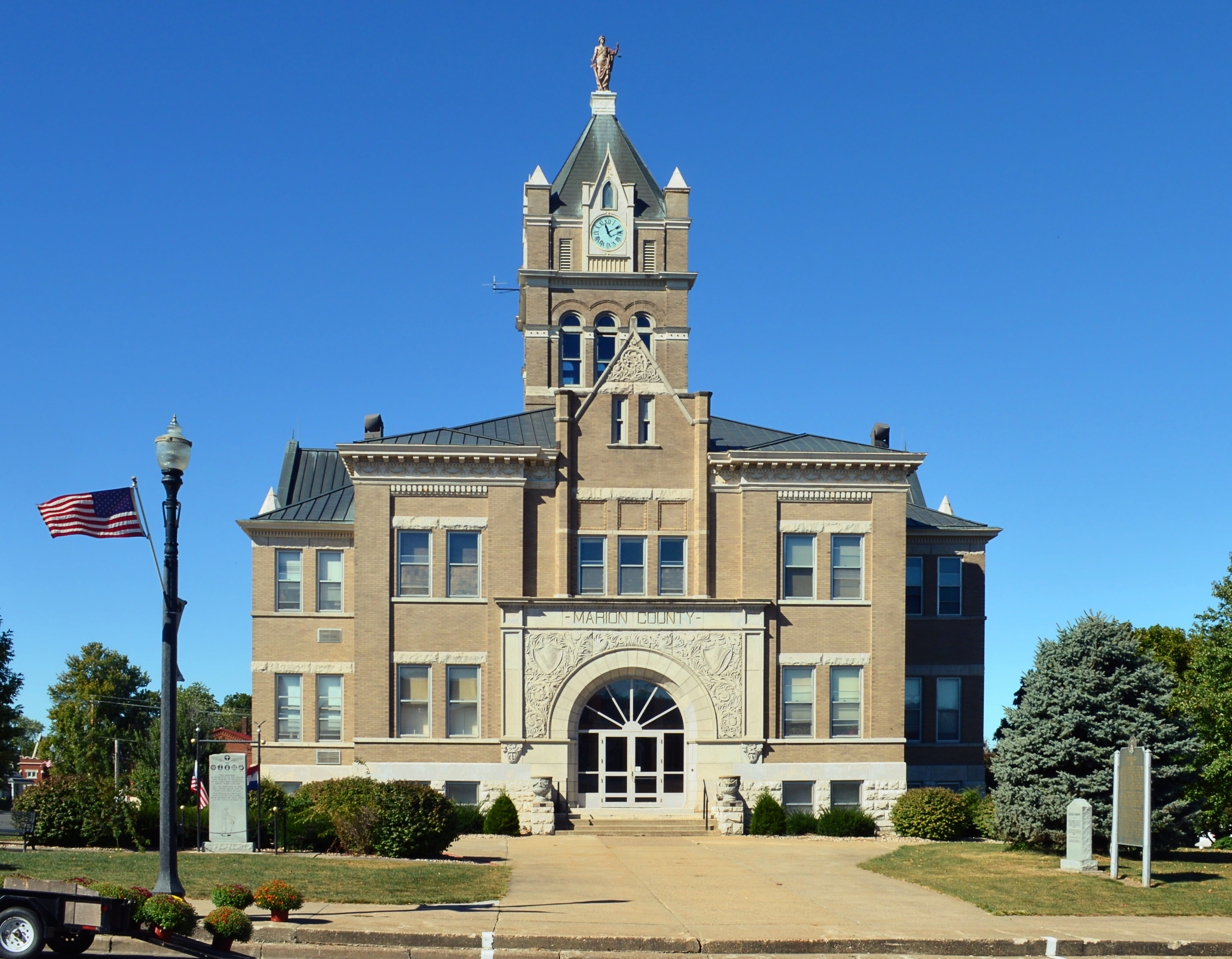
- Marion County Courthouse in Palmyra

- Location within the U.S. state of Missouri
- Coordinates: 39°49′N 91°37′W
- Country: United States
- State: Missouri
- Founded: December 23, 1826
- Named for: Francis Marion
- Seat: Palmyra
- Largest city: Hannibal

Area
  - Total: 444 sq mi (1,150 km^{2})
  - Land: 437 sq mi (1,130 km^{2})
  - Water: 7.4 sq mi (19 km^{2}) 1.7%

Population (2020)
  - Total: 28,525
  - Estimate (2025): 28,525
  - Density: 64/sq mi (25/km^{2})
- Time zone: UTC−6 (Central)
  - Summer (DST): UTC−5 (CDT)
- Congressional district: 6th
- Website: marioncounty-mo.gov

Marion County is a county located in the northeastern portion of Missouri. As of the 2020 census, the population was 28,525. Its county seat is Palmyra. Unique from most third-class counties in the state, Marion has two county courthouses, the second located in Hannibal. The county was organized on December 23, 1826, and named for General Francis Marion, the "Swamp Fox," who was from South Carolina and served in the American Revolutionary War. The area was known as the "Two Rivers Country" before organization. Marion County is part of the Hannibal, Missouri Micropolitan Statistical Area, which is included in the Quincy-Hannibal, IL-MO Combined Statistical Area.

== Geography ==
According to the U.S. Census Bureau, the county has a total area of 444 square miles (1,150 km^{2}), of which 437 square miles (1,130 km^{2}) is land, and 7.4 square miles (19 km^{2}) (1.7%) is water.

=== Adjacent counties ===
- Lewis County (north)
- Adams County, Illinois (northeast)
- Pike County, Illinois (southeast)
- Ralls County (south)
- Monroe County (southwest)
- Shelby County (west)

=== Major roadways ===
- I-72
- US 24
- US 36 / Route 110 (CKC)
  - US 36 Bus. (Monroe City)
- US 61
- Route 6
- Route 79
- Route 168

=== Transit ===
- Burlington Trailways
- OATS Transit
- Amtrak Illinois Zephyr and Carl Sandburg (proposed)

=== Railroads ===
- BNSF Railway
- Norfolk Southern Railway

== History ==
Marion County was created by the state legislature in 1845 from parts of Ralls and Shelby Counties. It was settled from Virginia and Kentucky by farmers looking for cheap farmland; some owned slaves. It was named after Francis Marion, a general in the Revolutionary War. The county seat is Palmyra, which was established in 1833. Hannibal became a locally important river port on the Mississippi. By the late 1800s, the county was the center of a thriving agricultural community. Tobacco was the main crop, though cotton, wheat, barley, oats, and hay were also grown. Livestock included horses, mules, and cattle.

The best known native son is Mark Twain (Samuel Langhorne Clemens) born in 1835, in the village of Florida. His youthful experiences in Hannibal became the setting for the adventures of Tom Sawyer and Huckleberry Finn. Other prominent locals included Governor John S. Phelps, and Confederate General A.P. Morehead. The region was bitterly divided in the Civil War but Unionist elements prevailed. Palmyra was the site of a skirmish in 1862, and the county was the site of several other battles and raids. Today, Marion County continues to be primarily an agricultural county. It is home to a number of historic sites and buildings, with a major tourist industry focused on Mark Twain characters and settings.

== Demographics ==
Historical population
Census	Pop.	Note	%±
1830	4,837		—
1840	9,623		98.9%
1850	12,230		27.1%
1860	18,838		54.0%
1870	23,780		26.2%
1880	24,837		4.4%
1890	26,233		5.6%
1900	26,331		0.4%
1910	30,572		16.1%
1920	30,226		−1.1%
1930	33,493		10.8%
1940	31,576		−5.7%
1950	29,765		−5.7%
1960	29,522		−0.8%
1970	28,121		−4.7%
1980	28,638		1.8%
1990	27,682		−3.3%
2000	28,289		2.2%
2010	28,781		1.7%
2020	28,525		−0.9%
2025 (est.)	28,525	Steady	0.0%
U.S. Decennial Census; 1790-1960 1900-1990; 1990-2000 2010

=== 2020 census ===
As of the 2020 census, the county had a population of 28,525. The median age was 40.1 years.

23.1% of residents were under the age of 18 and 19.0% of residents were 65 years of age or older. For every 100 females there were 93.6 males, and for every 100 females age 18 and over there were 91.8 males age 18 and over.

61.0% of residents lived in urban areas, while 39.0% lived in rural areas.

There were 11,491 households in the county, of which 29.4% had children under the age of 18 living with them and 27.8% had a female householder with no spouse or partner present. About 30.6% of all households were made up of individuals and 13.1% had someone living alone who was 65 years of age or older.

There were 12,847 housing units, of which 10.6% were vacant. Among occupied housing units, 64.7% were owner-occupied and 35.3% were renter-occupied. The homeowner vacancy rate was 1.5% and the rental vacancy rate was 10.1%.

=== Racial and ethnic composition ===
The racial makeup of the county was 88.1% White, 4.8% Black or African American, 0.3% American Indian and Alaska Native, 0.6% Asian, 0.1% Native Hawaiian and Pacific Islander, 0.6% from some other race, and 5.5% from two or more races. Hispanic or Latino residents of any race comprised 1.8% of the population.

Marion County, Missouri – Racial and ethnic composition Note: the US Census treats Hispanic/Latino as an ethnic category. This table excludes Latinos from the racial categories and assigns them to a separate category. Hispanics/Latinos may be of any race.
Race / Ethnicity (NH = Non-Hispanic)	Pop 1980	Pop 1990	Pop 2000	Pop 2010	Pop 2020	% 1980	% 1990	% 2000	% 2010	% 2020
White alone (NH)	26,968	26,131	26,236	26,202	24,930	94.17%	94.40%	92.74%	91.04%	87.40%
Black or African American alone (NH)	1,334	1,239	1,303	1,400	1,363	4.66%	4.48%	4.61%	4.86%	4.78%
Native American or Alaska Native alone (NH)	40	68	66	46	67	0.14%	0.25%	0.23%	0.16%	0.23%
Asian alone (NH)	73	106	78	153	165	0.25%	0.38%	0.28%	0.53%	0.58%
Native Hawaiian or Pacific Islander alone (NH)	x	x	15	20	16	x	x	0.05%	0.07%	0.06%
Other race alone (NH)	37	20	11	24	96	0.13%	0.07%	0.04%	0.08%	0.34%
Mixed race or Multiracial (NH)	x	x	328	545	1,372	x	x	1.16%	1.89%	4.81%
Hispanic or Latino (any race)	186	118	252	391	516	0.65%	0.43%	0.89%	1.36%	1.81%
Total	28,638	27,682	28,289	28,781	28,525	100.00%	100.00%	100.00%	100.00%	100.00%

=== 2010 census ===
As of the census of 2010, there were 28,781 people, 11,066 households, and 7,524 families residing in the county. The population density was 65 inhabitants per square mile (25/km^{2}). There were 12,443 housing units at an average density of 28 units per square mile (11/km^{2}). The racial makeup of the county was 93.26% White, 4.62% Black or African American, 0.27% Native American, 0.28% Asian, 0.08% Pacific Islander, 0.18% from other races, and 1.32% from two or more races. Approximately 0.89% of the population were Hispanic or Latino of any race. 28.5% were German, 25.6% American, 11.0% Irish, and 10.3% English ancestry.

There were 11,066 households, out of which 33.30% had children under the age of 18 living with them, 53.50% were married couples living together, 11.40% had a female householder with no husband present, and 32.00% were non-families. 28.10% of all households were made up of individuals, and 13.80% had someone living alone who was 65 years of age or older. The average household size was 2.44, and the average family size was 2.98.

In the county, the population was spread out, with 25.70% under the age of 18, 9.50% from 18 to 24, 26.40% from 25 to 44, 21.70% from 45 to 64, and 16.60% who were 65 years of age or older. The median age was 37 years. For every 100 females, there were 89.40 males. For every 100 females age 18 and over, there were 85.70 males.

The median income for a household in the county was $31,774, and the median income for a family was $41,290. Males had a median income of $30,935 versus $20,591 for females. The per capita income for the county was $16,964. About 9.30% of families and 12.10% of the population were below the poverty line, including 15.30% of those under age 18 and 10.50% of those age 65 or over.

== Education ==
School districts in Marion County (including those which may have schools and/or administration buildings in other counties)

- Hannibal 60 School District
- Lewis County C-1 School District
- Marion County R-II School District
- Monroe City R-I School District
- Palmyra R-I School District

=== Public schools ===
- Hannibal Public School District No. 60 – Hannibal
  - Veterans Elementary School (K-05)
  - A.D. Stowell Elementary School (K-05)
  - Mark Twain Elementary School (K-05)
  - Oakwood Elementary School (K-05)
  - Eugene Field Elementary School (K-05)
  - Early Childhood Center (PK)
  - Hannibal Middle School (06-08)
  - Hannibal High School (09-12)
- Palmyra R-I School District – Palmyra
  - Palmyra Elementary School (K-04)
  - Palmyra Middle School (05-08)
  - Palmyra High School (09-12)
- Marion County R-II School District – Philadelphia
  - Marion County Elementary School (K-06)
  - Marion County High School (07-12)

=== Private schools ===
- Holy Family Catholic School – Hannibal (K-09) – Roman Catholic
- St. John's Lutheran School – Hannibal (K-06) – Lutheran
- Mission Hill Christian Academy - Palmyra, Missouri (K-12)

=== Post-secondary ===
- Hannibal–LaGrange University – Hannibal – A private, four-year Southern Baptist university.

=== Public libraries ===
Hannibal Free Public Library

- Palmyra Bicentennial Public Library

== Communities ==
=== Cities and towns ===
- Hannibal
- Monroe City (mostly in Monroe County and a small part in Ralls County)
- Palmyra (county seat)

=== Census-designated place ===
- Philadelphia

=== Unincorporated communities ===
- Barkley
- Bellville
- Benbow
- Cave City
- Ely
- Emerson
- Heather
- Helton
- Hester
- Little Union
- Mungers
- Naomi
- Nelsonville
- Newmarket
- North River
- Sharpsburg
- Smileyville
- Taylor
- Uva
- Warren
- West Ely
- West Quincy
- White Bear
- Withers Mill
- Woodland

=== Former communities ===
- Cherry Dell
- Lamb
- Mark

== Politics ==
Marion County, Missouri

Elected countywide officials
Assessor	Mark Novak	Democratic
Circuit Clerk	Cheryl Damron (Division I) / Chris Tate (Division II)	Republican
County Clerk	Marla Meyers	Republican
Commissioner (presiding)	David Lomax	Republican
Commissioner (district 1)	Steve Begley	Republican
Commissioner (district 2)	Larry Welch	Republican
Coroner	Rick Jones	Republican
Prosecuting Attorney	Luke A Bryant	Republican
Public Administrator	Wendy Howe	Democratic
Recorder	Harla Friez	Democratic
Sheriff	Jimmy Shinn	Republican
Surveyor	John D. Janes	Independent
Treasurer	Joelle Fohey	Democratic

=== State ===
Past Gubernatorial Elections Results
Year	Republican	Democratic	Third Parties
2024	76.43% 9,887	21.54% 2,786	2.03% 263
2020	75.91% 10,082	22.70% 3,015	1.39% 185
2016	65.84% 8,484	31.86% 4,105	2.30% 297
2012	53.03% 6,380	44.83% 5,394	2.14% 257
2008	58.82% 7,341	39.77% 4,964	1.41% 176
2004	67.03% 8,292	31.77% 3,930	1.20% 148
2000	50.05% 5,832	48.88% 5,696	1.07% 125
1996	31.55% 3,388	66.68% 7,161	1.78% 191

Marion County is in Missouri's 5th district in the Missouri House of Representatives, represented by Louis Riggs (R-Hannibal).

Missouri House of Representatives — District 5 — Marion County (2018)
Party	Candidate	Votes	%	±%
Republican	Louis Riggs	16,446	100%	"+25.12"
n/a	n/a (unopposed general election)	n/a	n/a	n/a

Missouri House of Representatives — District 5 — Marion County (2016)
Party	Candidate	Votes	%	±%
Republican	Lindell F. Shumake	9,532	74.88%	+0.24
Democratic	O.C. Latta	3,197	25.12%	−0.24

Missouri House of Representatives — District 5 — Marion County (2014)
Party	Candidate	Votes	%	±%
Republican	Lindell F. Shumake	5,089	74.64%	+12.30
Democratic	C. Leroy Deichman	1,729	25.36%	−12.30

Missouri House of Representatives — District 5 — Marion County (2012)
Party	Candidate	Votes	%	±%
Republican	Lindell F. Shumake	7,445	62.34%	
Democratic	Tom Shively	4,497	37.66%	

All of Marion County is a part of Missouri's 18th District in the Missouri Senate; it is represented by Brian Munzlinger (R-Williamstown).

Missouri Senate — District 18 — Marion County (2022)
Party	Candidate	Votes	%	±%
Republican	Cindy O’Laughlin	42,989	75.8%	"+5.5%"
Democratic	"Ayanna Shivers"	"13,739"	"24.2%"	"−5.5%"

Missouri Senate — District 18 — Marion County (2018)
Party	Candidate	Votes	%	±%
Republican	Cindy O’Laughlin	46,263	70.3%	"−29.7%
Democratic	"Crystal Stephens"	"19,555"	"29.7%"	"+29.7%"

Missouri Senate — District 18 — Marion County (2014)
Party	Candidate	Votes	%	±%
Republican	Brian Munzlinger	5,630	100.00%	

=== Federal ===
U.S. Senate — Missouri — Marion County (2016)
Party	Candidate	Votes	%	±%
Republican	Roy Blunt	8,239	64.11%	+11.46
Democratic	Jason Kander	4,115	32.02%	−11.77
Libertarian	Jonathan Dine	277	2.16%	−1.40
Green	Johnathan McFarland	128	1.00%	+1.00
Constitution	Fred Ryman	93	0.72%	+0.72

U.S. Senate — Missouri — Marion County (2012)
Party	Candidate	Votes	%	±%
Republican	Todd Akin	6,350	52.65%	
Democratic	Claire McCaskill	5,281	43.79%	
Libertarian	Jonathan Dine	429	3.56%	

Marion County is included in Missouri's 6th Congressional District and is represented by Sam Graves (R-Tarkio) in the U.S. House of Representatives.

U.S. House of Representatives — Missouri's 6th Congressional District - Marion County (2016)
Party	Candidate	Votes	%	±%
Republican	Sam Graves	9,405	74.46%	+0.30
Democratic	David M. Blackwell	2,915	23.08%	−0.76
Libertarian	Russ Lee Monchil	193	1.53%	−0.47
Green	Mike Diel	118	0.93%	+0.93

U.S. House of Representatives — Missouri’s 6th Congressional District — Marion County (2014)
Party	Candidate	Votes	%	±%
Republican	Sam Graves	5,008	74.16%	+9.76
Democratic	Bill Hedge	1,610	23.84%	−9.88
Libertarian	Russ Lee Monchil	135	2.00%	+0.12

U.S. House of Representatives — Missouri's 6th Congressional District — Marion County (2012)
Party	Candidate	Votes	%	±%
Republican	Sam Graves	7,462	64.40%	
Democratic	Kyle Yarber	3,907	33.72%	
Libertarian	Russ Lee Monchil	218	1.88%	

United States presidential election results for Marion County, Missouri
Year	Republican		Democratic		Third party(ies)	
Year	No.	%	No.	%	No.	%
1888	2,294	39.02%	3,365	57.24%	220	3.74%
1892	2,154	36.47%	3,634	61.52%	119	2.01%
1896	2,699	39.93%	4,008	59.30%	52	0.77%
1900	2,490	38.16%	3,927	60.17%	109	1.67%
1904	2,433	42.22%	3,127	54.27%	202	3.51%
1908	2,554	37.71%	3,982	58.80%	236	3.48%
1912	1,693	28.65%	3,471	58.74%	745	12.61%
1916	2,759	37.28%	4,534	61.26%	108	1.46%
1920	4,660	40.36%	6,719	58.20%	166	1.44%
1924	5,408	43.98%	5,739	46.67%	1,150	9.35%
1928	7,664	57.34%	5,679	42.49%	24	0.18%
1932	4,123	28.40%	10,293	70.89%	103	0.71%
1936	4,628	29.39%	11,068	70.29%	51	0.32%
1940	5,892	37.62%	9,723	62.09%	45	0.29%
1944	4,560	34.68%	8,575	65.21%	14	0.11%
1948	3,802	29.37%	9,122	70.47%	20	0.15%
1952	6,162	42.10%	8,457	57.78%	18	0.12%
1956	5,657	45.14%	6,874	54.86%	0	0.00%
1960	6,431	48.76%	6,758	51.24%	0	0.00%
1964	3,605	30.25%	8,314	69.75%	0	0.00%
1968	4,732	41.62%	5,416	47.64%	1,221	10.74%
1972	7,197	63.31%	4,171	36.69%	0	0.00%
1976	5,501	47.17%	6,124	52.51%	38	0.33%
1980	6,036	49.53%	5,890	48.33%	260	2.13%
1984	6,831	59.42%	4,666	40.58%	0	0.00%
1988	5,034	47.16%	5,617	52.62%	23	0.22%
1992	4,762	40.41%	5,156	43.76%	1,865	15.83%
1996	4,653	43.40%	4,924	45.93%	1,144	10.67%
2000	6,550	55.93%	4,993	42.63%	169	1.44%
2004	7,815	62.76%	4,568	36.68%	70	0.56%
2008	7,705	61.38%	4,703	37.47%	145	1.16%
2012	7,923	65.17%	4,031	33.16%	204	1.68%
2016	9,419	72.80%	2,994	23.14%	525	4.06%
2020	9,915	74.28%	3,202	23.99%	231	1.73%
2024	9,991	75.96%	3,032	23.05%	130	0.99%

Historically a Democratic county in the 20th century, with the exception of Republican landslides in 1972 and 1984, Marion County has been reliably Republican since 2000. The last Democrat to receive 40% or more of the vote was Al Gore that same year.

=== Missouri presidential preference primary (2008) ===
Former U.S. Senator Hillary Clinton (D-New York) received more votes, a total of 1,587, than any candidate from either party in Marion County during the 2008 presidential primary.

== See also ==
- National Register of Historic Places listings in Marion County, Missouri
