= Maple Street Historic District =

Maple Street Historic District can refer to:

- Maple Street Historic District (Southbridge, Massachusetts)
- Maple Street Historic District (Addison, New York)
- Maple Street Historic District (Battle Creek, Michigan)
- Maple Street Historic District (Lewisburg, West Virginia)

== See also ==
- Elm–Maple–South Streets Historic District
- Maple Avenue Historic District (disambiguation)
- Maple Street (disambiguation)
