= Maple Avenue Historic District =

Maple Avenue Historic District or Maple Avenue District may refer to:

- Maple Avenue/Maple Lane Historic District, Highland Park, Illinois, listed on the U.S. National Register of Historic Places (NRHP)
- Maple Avenue District, Danville, Kentucky, NRHP-listed in Boyle County, Kentucky
- Maple Avenue Historic District (Cambridge, Massachusetts), NRHP-listed
- Maple Avenue Historic District (Elmira, New York), NRHP-listed
- Maple Avenue Historic District (Hannibal, Missouri), NRHP-listed

== See also ==
- Maple Avenue (disambiguation)
- Maple Street Historic District (disambiguation)
