= Maple Street =

Maple Street may refer to:

- Maple Street, London, a street in central London
- Maple Street Bridge (Spokane, Washington), a girder bridge in Spokane, Washington
- Maple Street Covered Bridge, a covered bridge in Fairfax, Vermont
- Maple Street Cemetery, a historic cemetery in Adams, Massachusetts
- Maple Street Chapel, a historic Gothic Revival building in Lombard, Illinois
- Maple Street Community Garden, a community garden in Brooklyn, New York City
- Maple Street Overpass, a historic bridge in Fayetteville, Arkansas

== See also ==
- House at 68 Maple Street, historic building in Newton, Massachusetts
- House at 111 E. Maple Street, historic house in Maquoketa, Iowa
- "The House on Maple Street", a 1993 short story by Stephen King
- Maple Street Memories, a 1987 album by The Statler Brothers
- "The Monsters Are Due on Maple Street", a 1960 episode of The Twilight Zone
- Maple (disambiguation)
- Maple Avenue (disambiguation)
- Maple Street Historic District (disambiguation), multiple places in the United States
