= TimeLine Theatre Company =

TimeLine Theatre
- Interactive map of TimeLine Theatre
- Address: 5035 N Broadway Avenue; Chicago, Illinois; United States
- Coordinates: 41.9738°N 87.6593°W

Website
- timelinetheatre.com

TimeLine Theatre Company is a not-for-profit theater company located in Chicago, Illinois. Founded in 1997, TimeLine is a midsize theater with an annual budget exceeding $1 million.

== History ==
TimeLine Theatre Company was founded in April 1997 by six graduates of The Theatre School at DePaul University: Founding Artistic Director Nick Bowling, Brock Goldberg, Kevin Hagan, Juliet Hart, PJ Powers and Pat Tiedemann. On April 18, 1998, the company produced its first play, Summit Conference by Robert David MacDonald, at the Performance Loft Theatre at the 2nd Unitarian Church in Chicago. In September 1999, TimeLine moved into a new home in Baird Hall Theatre at the Wellington Avenue United Church of Christ on Wellington Ave., Chicago. The first production in this new home was Gaslight by Patrick Hamilton, which opened on October 21, 1999.

Starting with their 2011-2012 season, TimeLine began producing one play a season at a larger offsite location to accommodate audience growth.

In 1999, PJ Powers succeeded Bowling as Artistic Director. In 2007, Elizabeth K. Auman was named Managing Director. The company has since grown to include nine full-time staff members.

In 2026, TimeLine relocated to the former W. C. Reebie and Brother Building in Uptown near Argyle Street, which it celebrated with a series of events. The 21,000 square foot space, a mix of new construction and renovations to an existing building, includes a 250-seat blackbox theater, a bar, rehearsal and event spaces and on-site offices. TimeLine inaugurated the new theater in May 2026 with the Chicago premiere of a new version by Amy Herzog of Ibsen's An Enemy of the People.

== Awards ==
TimeLine has received 65 Joseph Jefferson awards, including 12 awards for Outstanding Production since 2001.

In addition to awards for achievement in productions, TimeLine has also received the following recognition as an organization for its administrative management:

- 2016 John D. and Catherine T. MacArthur Foundation Award for Creative and Effective Institutions
- 2011 American Theatre Wing's National Theatre Company Grant
  One of the Top 10 Emerging Theatre Companies by the American Theatre Wing, founder of the Tony Awards.
- 2011 "Best Theatre"
  Chicago Magazine "Best of Chicago"
- 2010 "Company of the Year"
  Terry Teachout, The Wall Street Journal
- 2009 Richard Goodman Strategic Planning Award, Non-Profit
- 2006 Alford-Axelson Award for Nonprofit Managerial Excellence

== See also ==
- Theater in Chicago
