= W. C. Reebie and Brother Building =

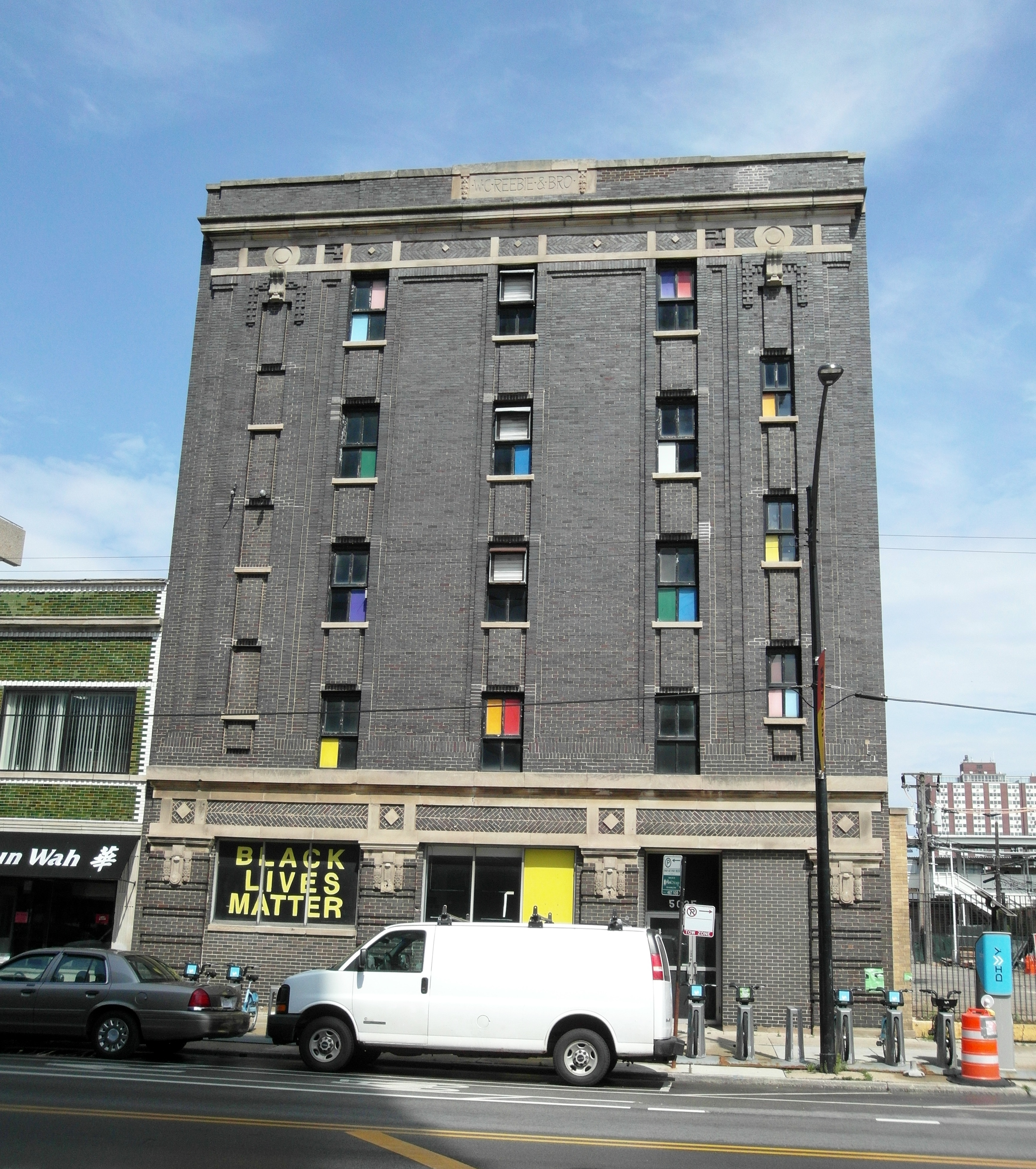
- Original facade, pre-demolition
- Interactive map of the W. C. Reebie and Brother Building area

General information
- Architectural style: Classical revival
- Location: 5035 N. Broadway, Chicago, Illinois
- Coordinates: 41°58′25.77″N 87°39′33.54″W
- Completed: 1911
- Demolished: 2024

Technical details
- Floor count: 5
- Floor area: 45,000 square feet (4,200 m^{2})

The W. C. Reebie and Brother Building is a building on Broadway in Chicago's Uptown community. Initially a contributing property to the West Argyle Street Historic District, its was partially demolished in 2024 and redeveloped into an entertainment complex by TimeLine Theatre Company.

== History ==
The building was built in 1911 by William P. McEvoy & Co. It originally served as a furniture storage warehouse for the W. C. Reebie and Brother Company. In 1919, a rear addition was built, designed by George Kingsley. In 2010, the building was sold to real estate investor John Thomas, and in 2013 it was sold to Cedar Street Companies. In 2018, the building was purchased by TimeLine Theatre Company. In 2019, TimeLine Theatre received $1.5 million in funding from the State of Illinois to convert the building into a theater. In June 2021, TimeLine Theatre announced plans to demolish the building's historic facade and replace it with a glass and metal system. The building reopened in 2026.
