= Eighth and Center Streets Baptist Church =

Historic church in Missouri, United States

- U.S. National Register of Historic Places
- U.S. Historic district – Contributing property
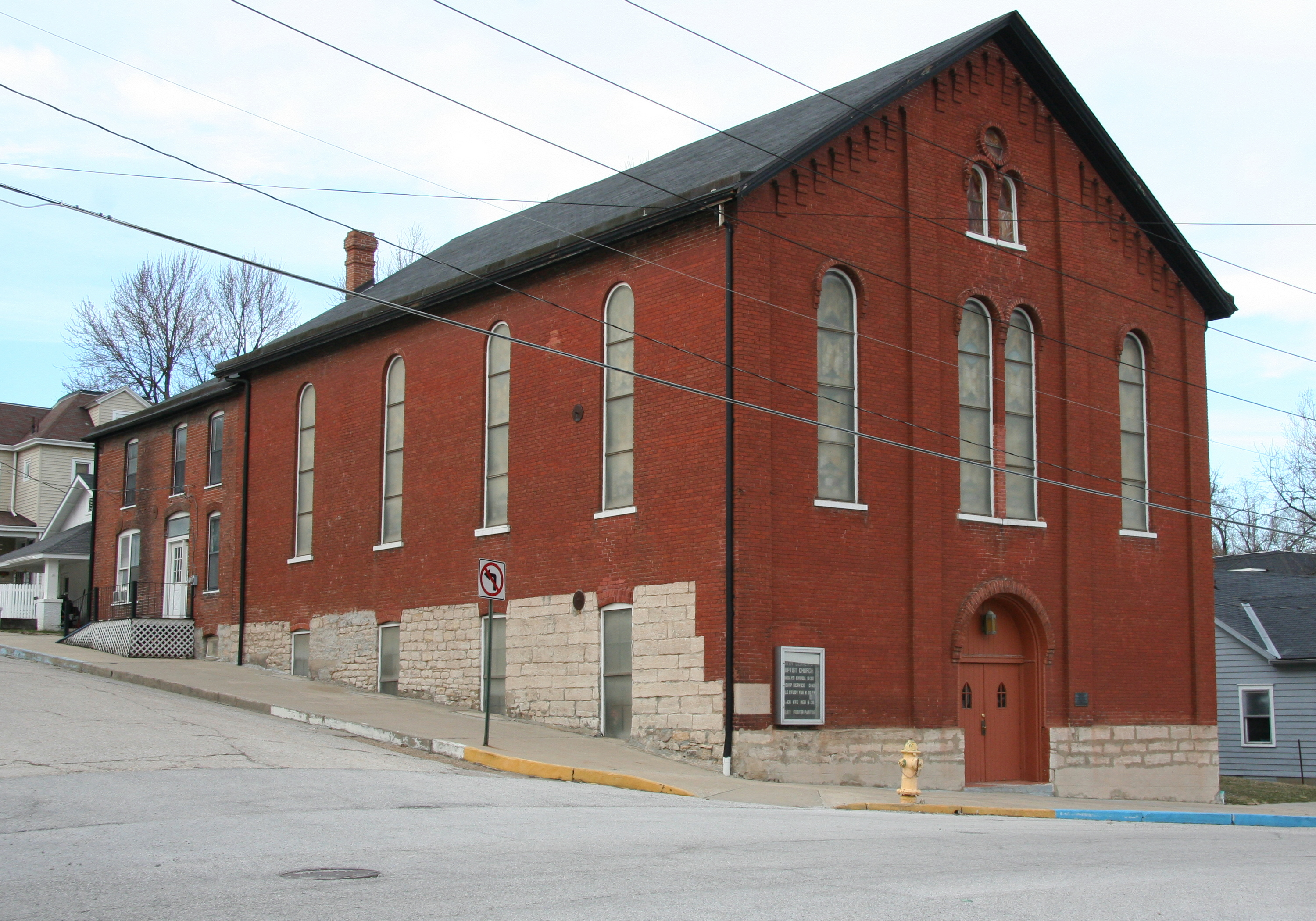
- Location: 722 Center St., Hannibal, Missouri
- Coordinates: 39°42′28″N 91°21′48″W
- Area: 0.1 acres (0.040 ha)
- Built: 1872
- Architectural style: Romanesque
- NRHP reference No.: 80002376
- Added to NRHP: September 4, 1980

Eighth and Center Streets Baptist Church is a historic African-American Baptist church located at 722 Center Street in Hannibal, Marion County, Missouri. Built in 1872, the church is a red brick, two-level rectangular Romanesque Revival building measuring approximately 70 feet long by 40 feet wide.

In 1980, it was listed on the National Register of Historic Places. It is located in the Central Park Historic District and Maple Avenue Historic District.
