= Maple Avenue/Maple Lane Historic District =

Historic district in Illinois, United States

- U.S. National Register of Historic Places
- U.S. Historic district
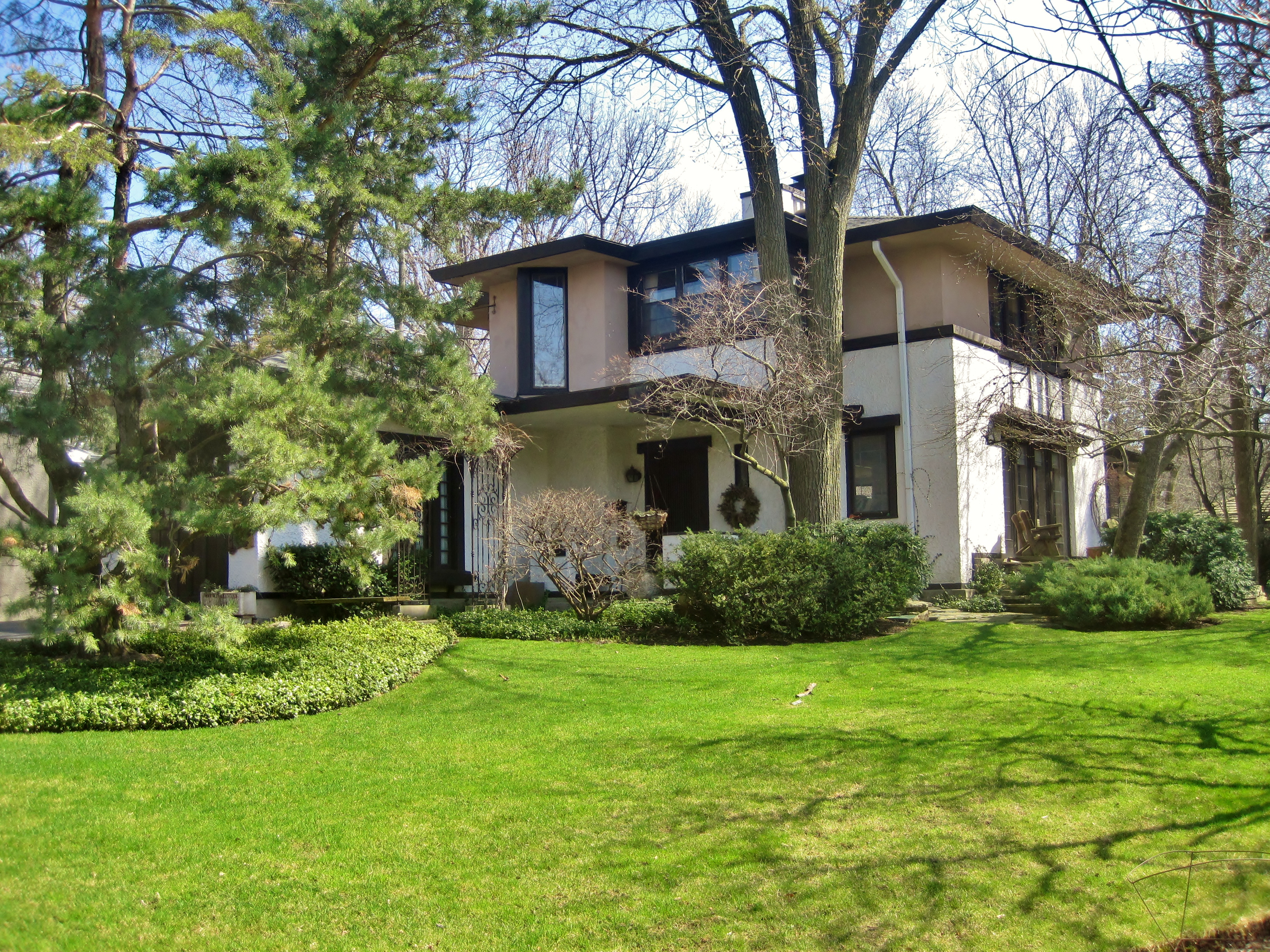
- The Herman Pomper House

- Location within Illinois Location within the United States
- Location: Maple Ave. and Maple Lane between St. Johns Ave. and Sheridan Rd., Highland Park, Illinois
- Coordinates: 42°11′41″N 87°47′58″W
- Area: 9 acres (3.6 ha)
- Built: 1907
- Architect: George W. Maher, others
- Landscape architect: Jens Jensen
- Architectural style: Late 19th And 20th Century Revivals, Prairie School
- MPS: Highland Park MRA
- NRHP reference No.: 82002570
- Added to NRHP: September 29, 1982

The Maple Avenue/Maple Lane Historic District is a historic area of Highland Park, Illinois, United States. The twelve-building district features four houses designed by George W. Maher and one designed by John S. Van Bergen.

== Architecture ==
The 9-acre (3.6 ha) district features four homes designed by George W. Maher. Three of these houses also feature landscaping by Jens Jensen. The H. Scarborough House was completed around 1907 and is typical of Maher's designs with broad massings and wide overhangs. The D. W. Lamborn House is a basic rectangular design, but is otherwise a typical Maher design. The R. Smith House has arches over the front bay and a broad, overhanging roof. The three-story Prairie School house is on a 2-acre (0.81 ha) wooded lot. It was extensively remodeled in 1972, but the exterior was preserved. The Samuel H. Bingham House is the lone Maher design without a Jensen landscape. It is unusual for a Maher design with a shingled second story exterior. It also lacks canted walls and segmented arches.

The Herman Pomper House, a John S. Van Bergen design, is also found in the district. This house, completed in 1925, features brown wood trim on stucco. The cruciform house is typical of Prairie School design. Henry Dubin design an International Style house at 2350 Maple Lane in 1949. Like his other house, Dubin's dwelling is steel frame. Six other houses contribute to the district's historic and architectural theme.

The district was recognized by the National Park Service with a listing on the National Register of Historic Places on September 29, 1982.
