= Twinehurst American Optical Company Neighborhood =

- U.S. National Register of Historic Places
- U.S. Historic district
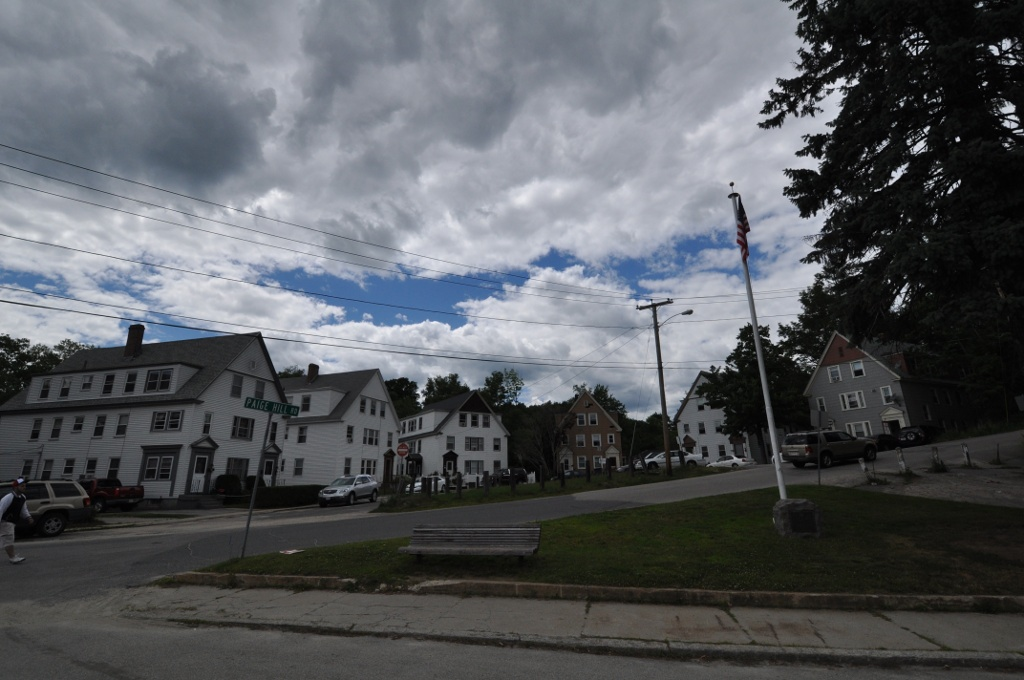

- Location within Massachusetts Location within the United States
- Location: Twinehurst Place, Southbridge, Massachusetts
- Coordinates: 42°4′42″N 72°1′57″W
- Architectural style: Colonial Revival
- MPS: Southbridge MRA
- NRHP reference No.: 89000593
- Added to NRHP: June 22, 1989

The Twinehurst American Optical Company Neighborhood is a residential historic district in Southbridge, Massachusetts. It consists of seven three family houses built by the owners of the American Optical Company to provide housing for their workers. The district was listed on the National Register of Historic Places in 1989.

Six of the seven houses are on Twinehurst Place, a short loop near the junction of Paige Hill Road and Central Street; one house has an address on Central Street but is physically adjacent to the others. The center of the loop is an open grassy area, giving a clear view of the neighborhood. All of the houses were built between 1915 and 1917, and exhibit Colonial Revival characteristics despite subsequent alteration. The typical house has a three-bay front facade, with the building entrances in the end bays, topped by a gabled pediment above. Two of the buildings have only a single entrance. Most of the buildings have three-part picture windows in the center bay.

The houses appear to be somewhat typical 2 1/2-story two-family houses, with their gables toward the street. However, each has extended dormers sufficient to provide a full apartment on the third floor. Each unit originally had a porch on the south side, but in all cases these have been subsequently enclosed. The houses originally had wood-shingle siding, but this has generally been changed: on some of the houses it has been replaced by wider wood siding, and on others by synthetic siding. Despite these changes, Colonial Revival trim details have generally been preserved.

== See also ==
- Maple Street Historic District (Southbridge, Massachusetts), an American Optical housing district
- Windsor Court Historic District, another American Optical housing district
- National Register of Historic Places listings in Southbridge, Massachusetts
- National Register of Historic Places listings in Worcester County, Massachusetts
