= Maple Street Historic District (Southbridge, Massachusetts) =

Historic district in Massachusetts, United States

- U.S. National Register of Historic Places
- U.S. Historic district
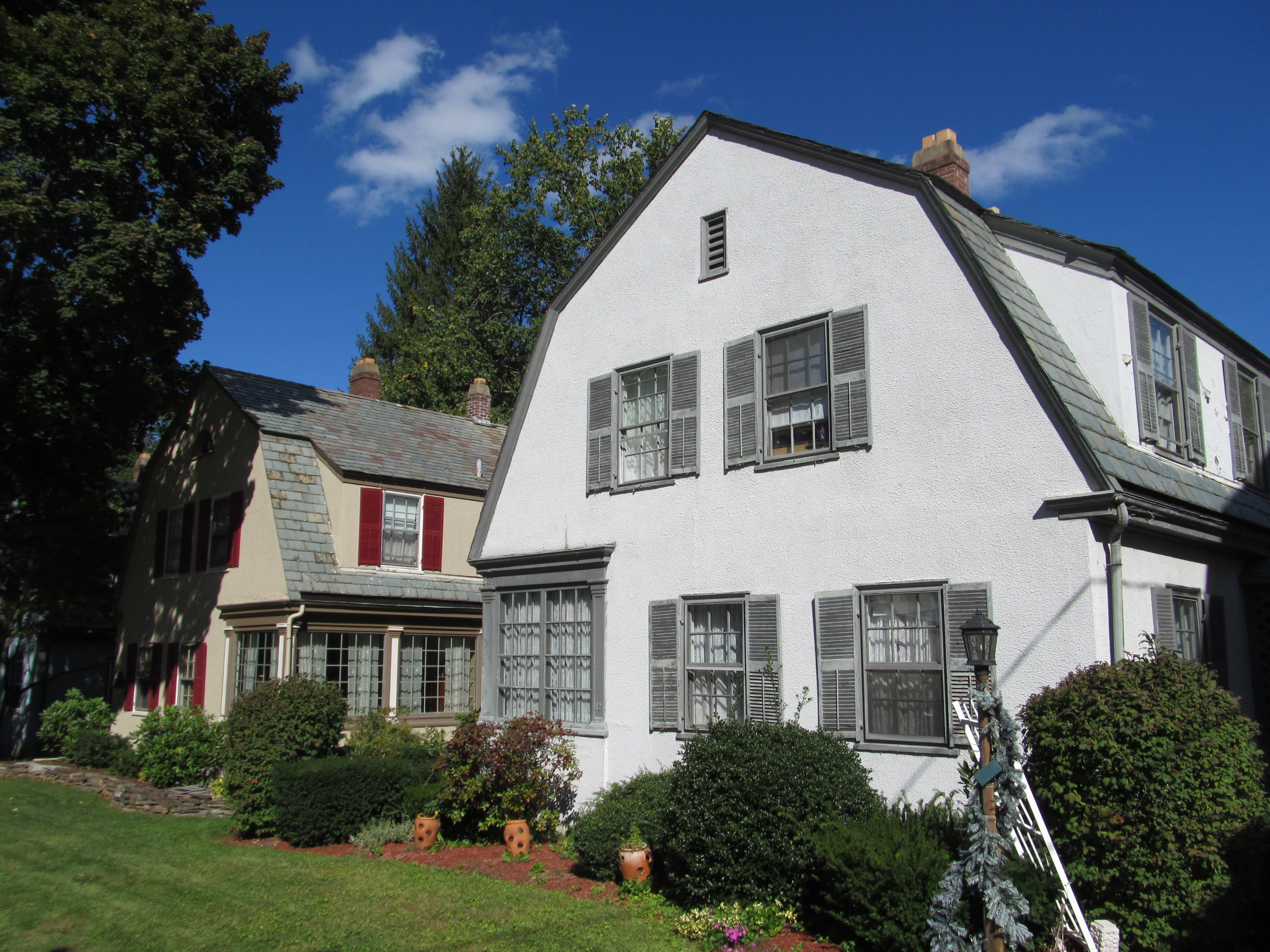
- Houses on Maple Street

- Location within Massachusetts Location within the United States
- Location: Maple St., Southbridge, Massachusetts
- Coordinates: 42°4′26″N 72°1′43″W
- Area: 1.15 acres (0.47 ha)
- Built: 1915
- Architect: Loring & Leland
- Architectural style: Colonial Revival
- MPS: Southbridge MRA
- NRHP reference No.: 89000597
- Added to NRHP: June 22, 1989

The Maple Street Historic District consists of a cluster of ten similar worker cottages on Maple Street in Southbridge, Massachusetts. They were built as part of an effort by the locally important American Optical Company to improve the quality of its worker housing in the 1910s. The district was listed on the National Register of Historic Places in 1989.

== Description and history ==
The American Optical Company was a major employer in Southbridge from the late 19th century well into the 20th century. Its owners, members of the Wells family, had a history of building housing units (which they retained personal ownership of) to rent to workers in their factories. At some point in the early 20th century the company began acquiring existing houses which it also used to provide worker housing. Around 1915 the company built a series of housing units. The Maple Street cluster is one of these; others that have survived relatively intact include Windsor Court and Twinehurst Place, both of which consist of multiunit buildings.

The Maple Street properties are ten nearly identical wood-framed gambrel-roofed Colonial Revival (Dutch Colonial) cottages, which the company intended as housing for its foremen. All are oriented with a gable end to the street, with the main entrances of the houses on the sides, facing each other in pairs. Nominally 1 1/2 stories tall, they feature long dormers in their roof line that create a full second story inside. All feature a slate roof, stucco exterior, and an enclosed porch. The design work for them was done by Loring & Leland of Boston, who are known to have designed other worker housing areas.

== See also ==
- National Register of Historic Places listings in Southbridge, Massachusetts
- National Register of Historic Places listings in Worcester County, Massachusetts
