= Maple Avenue =

Maple Avenue may refer to:

- Maple Avenue (TV series), a 2007 German television soap opera
- Pennsylvania Route 271, a portion of which is Maple Avenue in Johnstown, Pennsylvania
- Virginia State Route 123, called Maple Avenue in Vienna, Virginia
- Maple Avenue Historic District (disambiguation), several historic sites in the U.S.
- Maple Avenue Elementary School, in Goffstown, New Hampshire
- Maple Avenue Middle School, in Saratoga Springs, New York

== See also ==
- Maple (disambiguation)
- Maple Street (disambiguation)
