= Hannibal Old Police Station and Jail =

- U.S. National Register of Historic Places
- U.S. Historic district – Contributing property
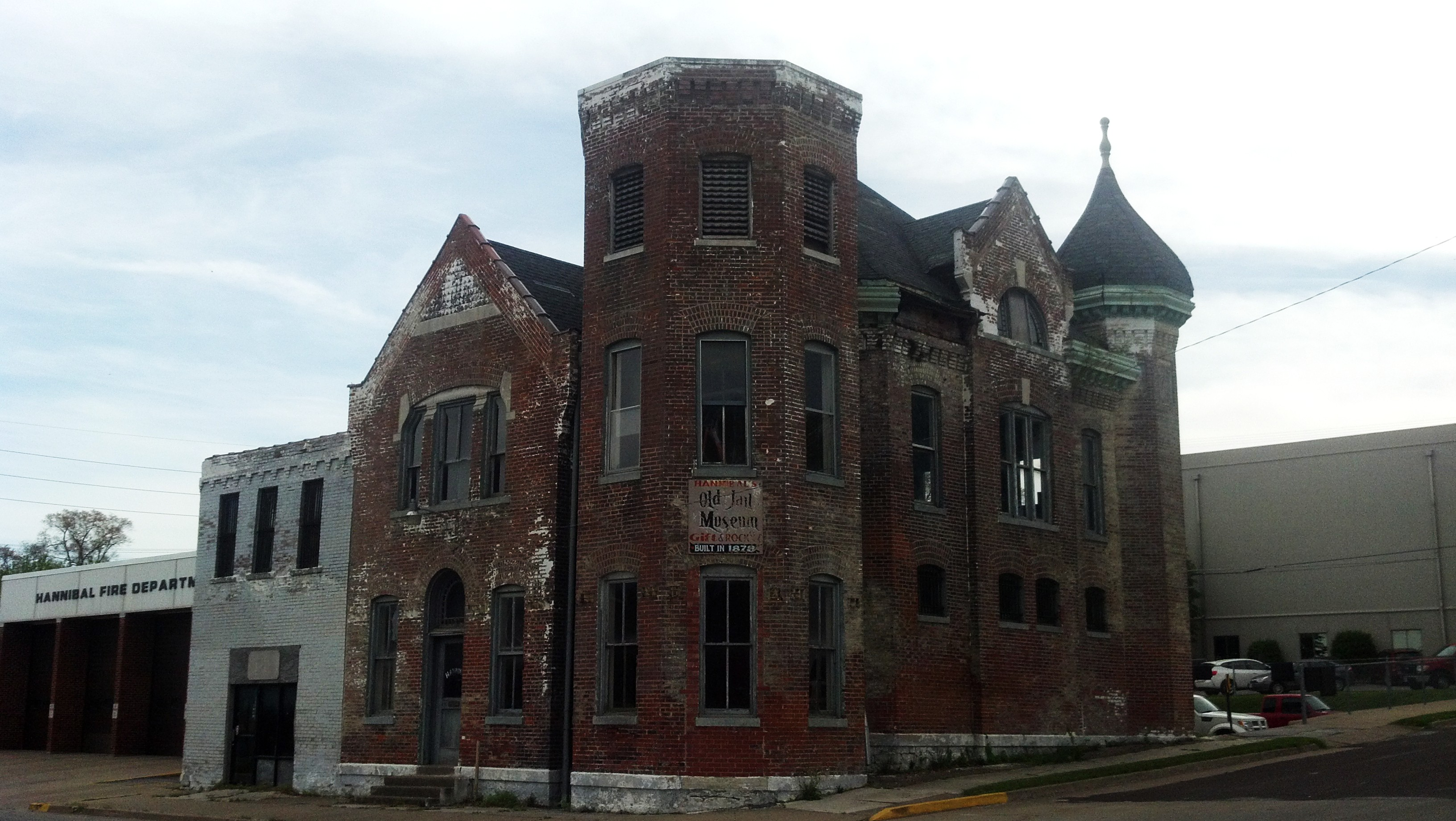
- Hannibal Old Police Station and Jail, September 2014

- Location within Missouri Location within the United States
- Location: 4th and Church Sts., Hannibal, Missouri
- Coordinates: 39°42′28″N 91°21′27″W
- Area: 0.1 acres (0.040 ha)
- Built: 1878-1879
- Architect: Hogg, John Oliver; Hogg, James Oliver
- Architectural style: Late Victorian, High Victorian Eclectic
- NRHP reference No.: 79001381
- Added to NRHP: July 17, 1979

Hannibal Old Police Station and Jail, also known a City Hall, is a historic police station and jail located at Hannibal, Marion County, Missouri. It was built in 1878–1879, and is a two-story, eclectic late Victorian style brick building on a granite foundation. It features two octagonal towers of different heights and a complex roof defined by a heavy bracketed cornice.

It was added to the National Register of Historic Places in 1979. It is located in the Central Park Historic District.
