= Central Park Historic District (Hannibal, Missouri) =

Historic district in Missouri, United States

- U.S. National Register of Historic Places
- U.S. Historic district
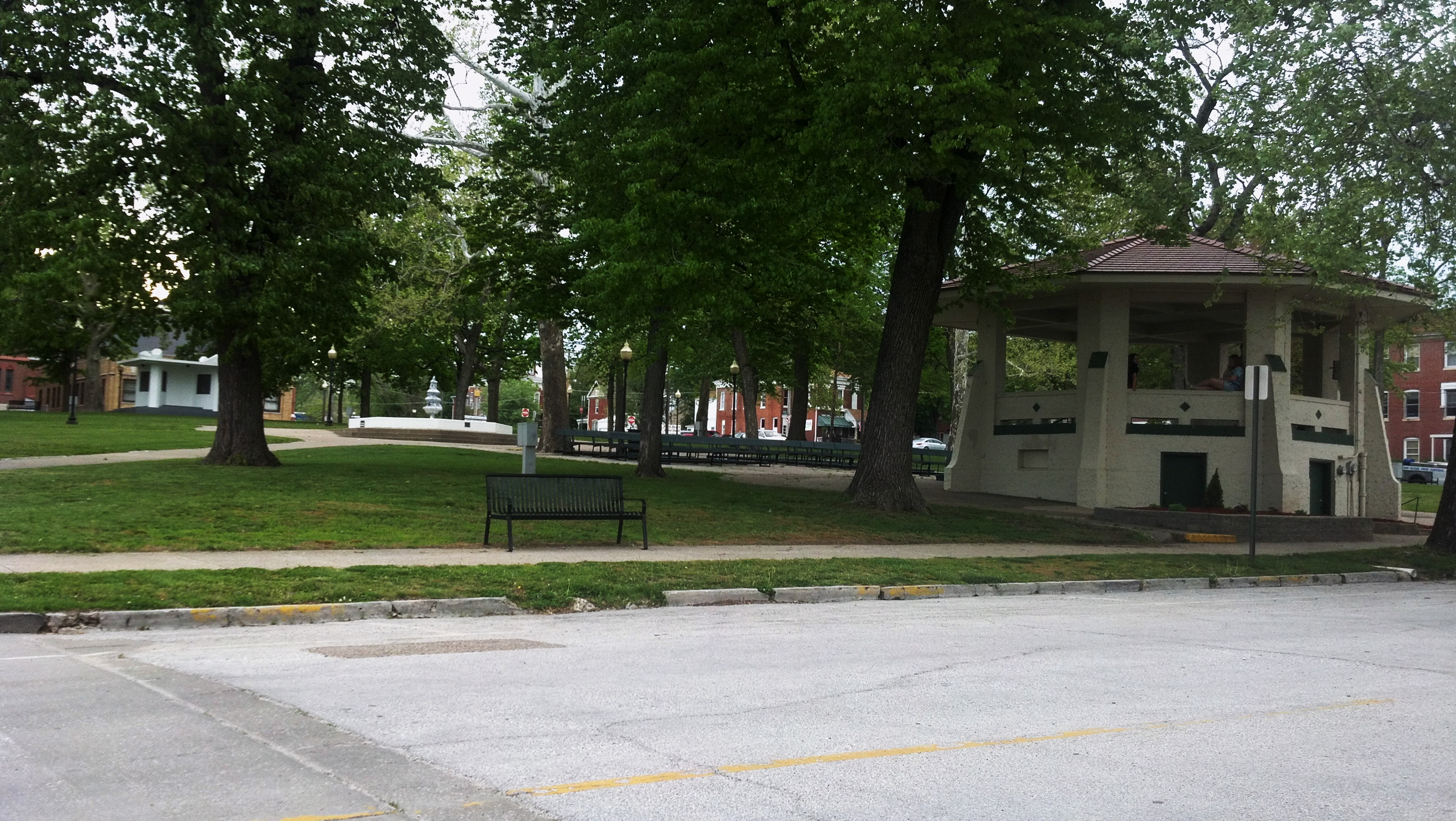
- Central Park Historic District, September 2014

- Location within Missouri Location within the United States
- Location: Roughly bounded b 4th, 7th, North and Lyon Sts., Hannibal, Missouri
- Coordinates: 39°42′32″N 91°21′36″W
- Area: 57 acres (23 ha)
- Architect: Multiple
- Architectural style: Mid 19th Century Revival, Late Victorian
- NRHP reference No.: 82000586
- Added to NRHP: October 7, 1982

Central Park Historic District is a national historic district located at Hannibal, Marion County, Missouri. The district encompasses 261 contributing buildings, 1 contributing site, and 4 contributing structures in a predominantly residential section of Hannibal. It developed between about 1840 and 1939, and includes representative examples of Romanesque Revival, Late Victorian, and Art Deco architecture. Located in the district are the separately listed Federal Building, Hannibal Old Police Station and Jail, and Eighth and Center Streets Baptist Church. Other notable contributing resources include Central Park with a war memorial monument and a life-size bronze statue of William Henry Hatch (1833-1894), City Hall (1909), old Missouri Guaranty Building (1894), Price Apartments (1904), YMCA (1910), Masonic Temple (1882), Park Methodist Church (1881, 1906), Retards Row (1855), Elks Building (1925), Holmes Building (c. 1904), Security Building (1912), Kerchival-Iakenan-Lathrop House, Admiral Coontz Birthplace, Inmaculate Conception Chapel (1854), Episcopalian Trinity Church (1860), and William C. Henn House (1937).

It was listed on the National Register of Historic Places in 1982.
