= United States Post Office (Hannibal, Missouri) =

- Federal Building
- U.S. National Register of Historic Places
- U.S. Historic district – Contributing property
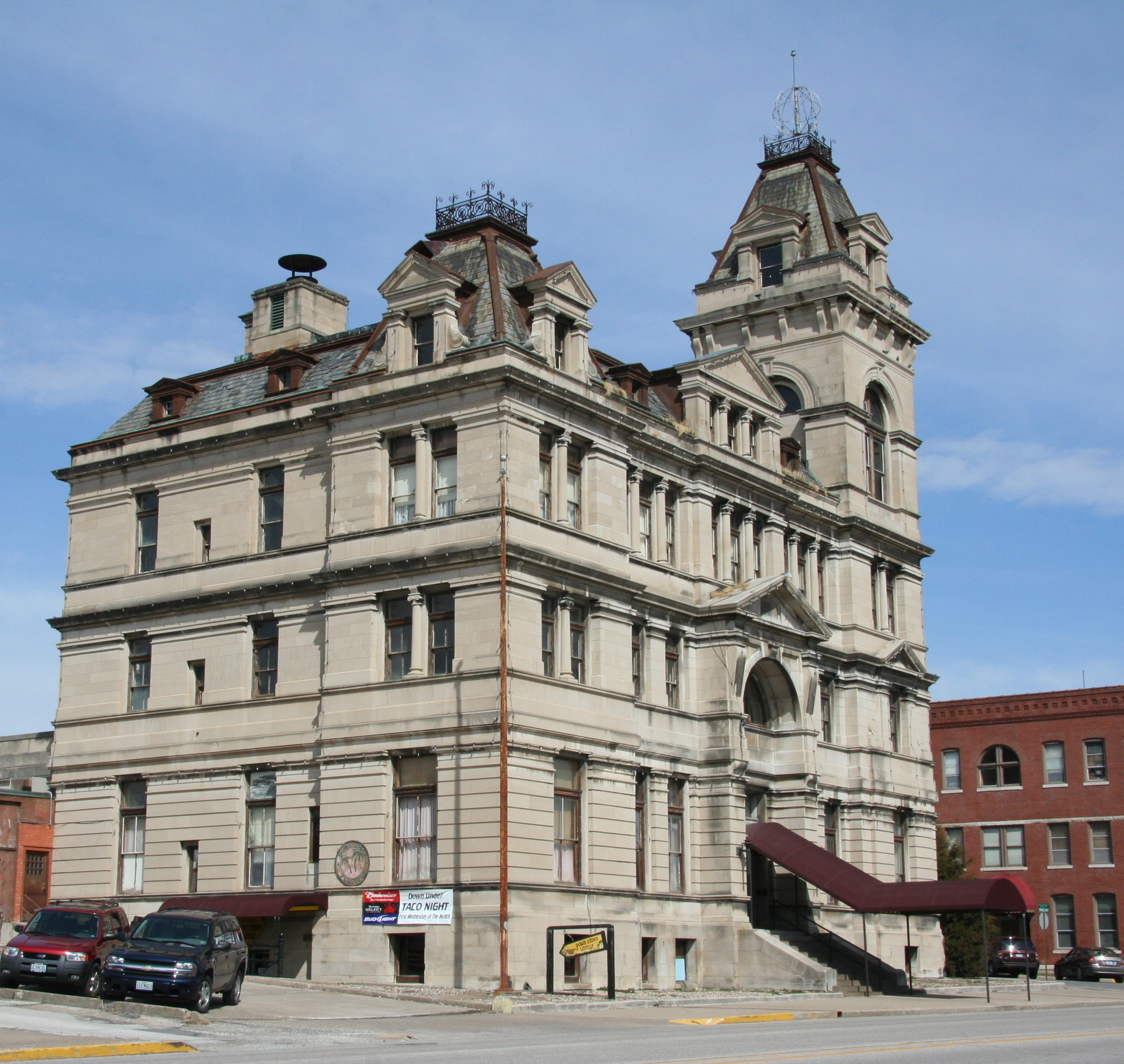

- Location within Missouri Location within the United States
- Location: 600 Broadway, Hannibal, Missouri
- Coordinates: 39°42′29″N 91°21′33″W
- Area: 0.4 acres (0.16 ha)
- Built: 1884
- Architect: Bell, Mifflin E.
- Architectural style: Second Empire
- NRHP reference No.: 80002377
- Added to NRHP: October 15, 1980

The United States Post Office at Hannibal, Missouri, is a federal building previously used as a post office and as a courthouse. It is also known as the Federal Building or the Naval Reserve Center, and is located at 600 Broadway. The building's architect was Mifflin E. Bell, and it was completed in 1888. The building is an excellent example of a late Second Empire architectural style. The United States District Court for the Eastern District of Missouri met in this building until 1960, and the U.S. Circuit Court for that district met here until that court was abolished in 1912. It is now owned by the city.

It was listed on the National Register of Historic Places in 1980 as "Federal Building". It is located in the Central Park Historic District.
