= Ebert-Dulany House =

Historic house in Missouri, United States

- U.S. National Register of Historic Places
- U.S. Historic district – Contributing property
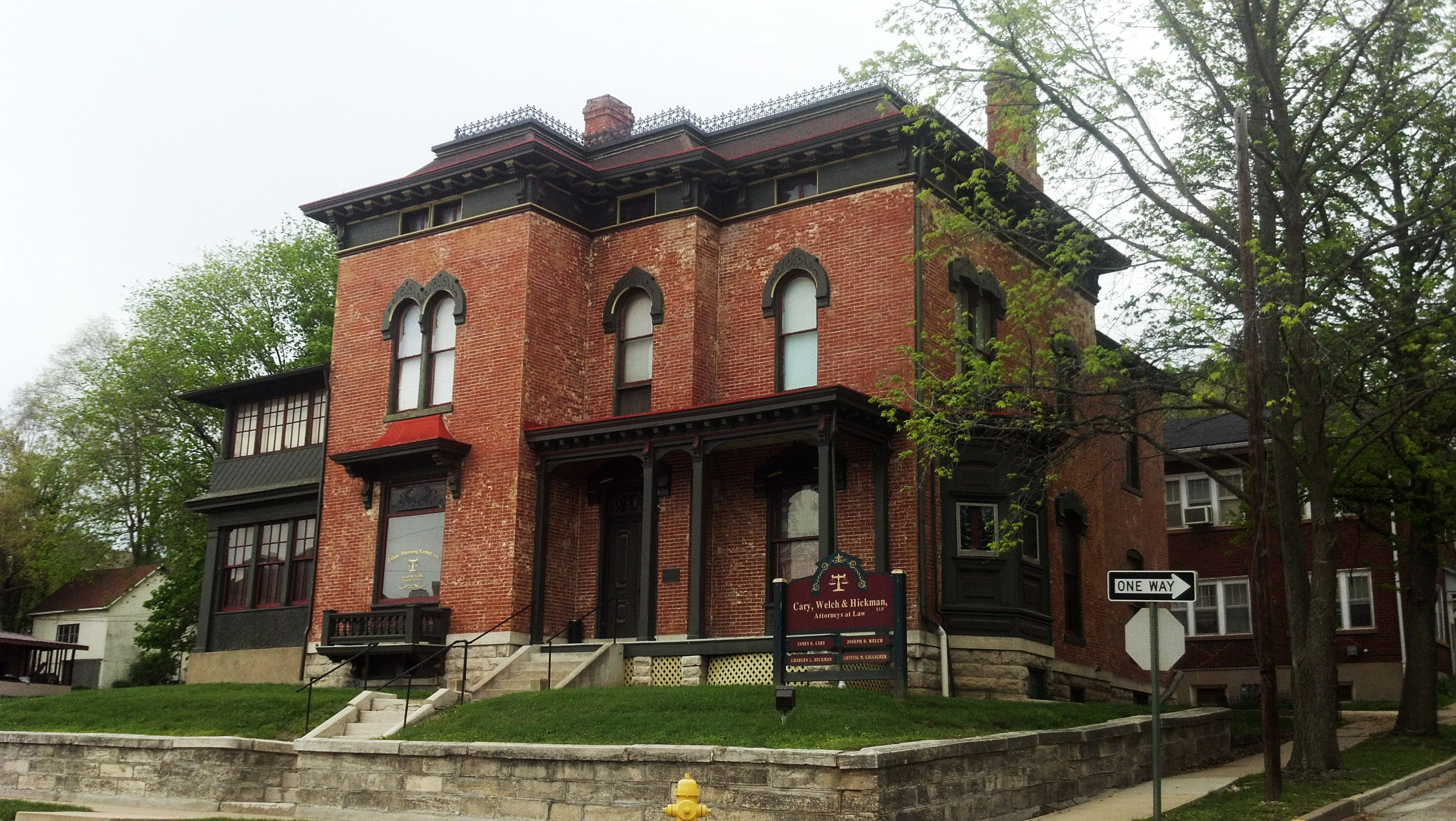
- Ebert-Dulany House, September 2014

- Location within Missouri Location within the United States
- Location: 1000 Center St., Hannibal, Missouri
- Coordinates: 39°42′24″N 91°21′13″W
- Area: less than one acre
- Built: 1865
- Architectural style: Second Empire
- NRHP reference No.: 83001030
- Added to NRHP: February 17, 1983

Ebert-Dulany House is a historic home located at Hannibal, Marion County, Missouri. It was built about 1865, and is a two-story, Second Empire style brick dwelling. It has a mansard roof and sits on a rock-faced ashlar foundation. It features a large bracketed hood above once sheltered a balcony and a wide bracketed frieze that runs below the modillioned cornice. The house was restored in the late-1980s.

It was added to the National Register of Historic Places in 1983. It is located in the Maple Avenue Historic District.
