= Elm–Maple–South Streets Historic District =

Historic district in Massachusetts, United States

- U.S. National Register of Historic Places
- U.S. Historic district
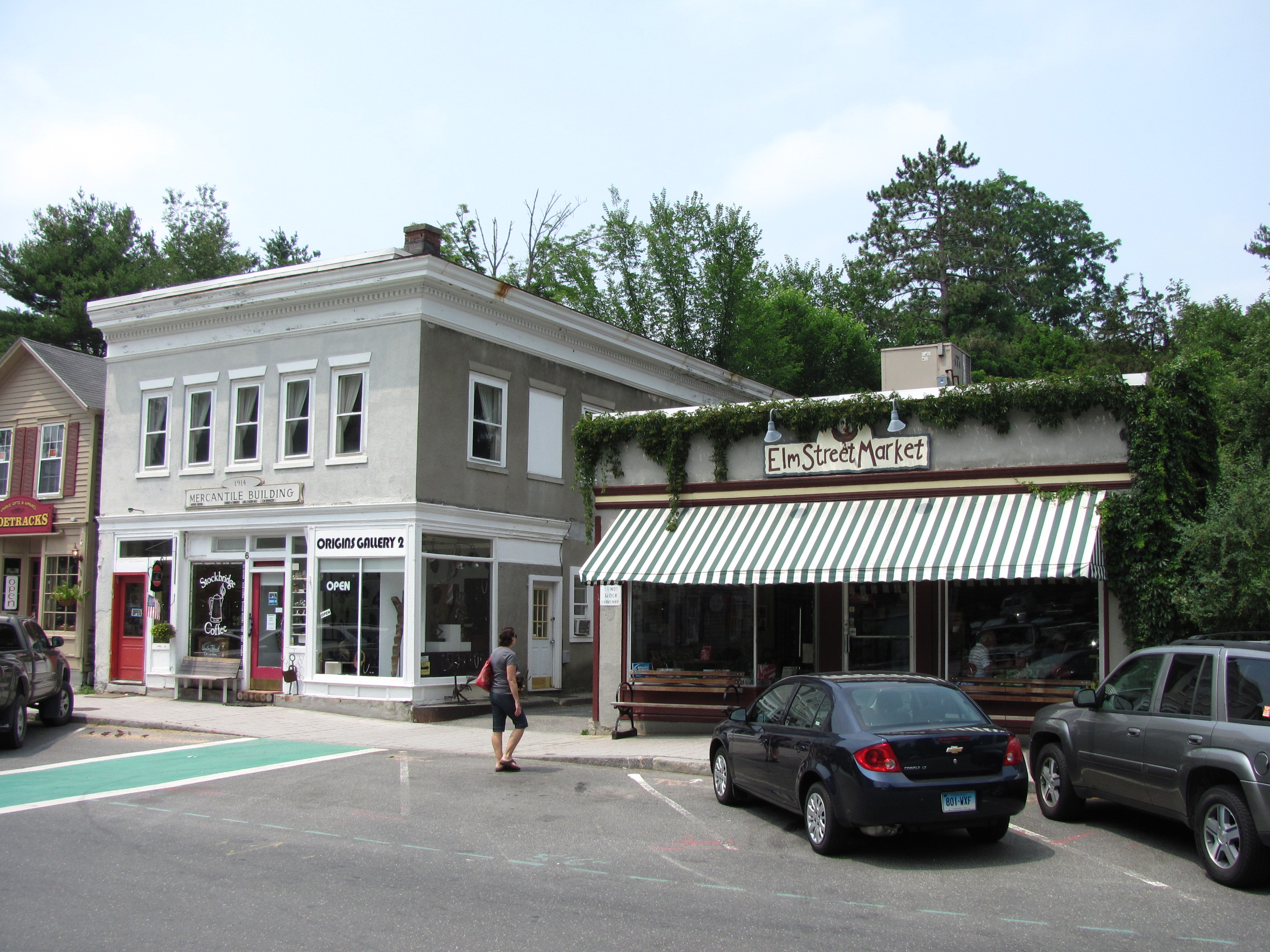
- Mercantile Building

- Location within Massachusetts Location within the United States
- Location: Stockbridge, Massachusetts
- Coordinates: 42°16′46″N 73°18′47″W
- Area: 25.1 acres (10.2 ha)
- Built: 1860
- Architect: Franz, Joseph; et al.
- Architectural style: Federal, Greek Revival
- NRHP reference No.: 04000932
- Added to NRHP: September 8, 2004

The Elm–Maple–South Streets Historic District is a historic district encompassing part of the historic downtown of Stockbridge, Massachusetts. The most prominent parts of Stockbridge lie within the Main Street Historic District, which abuts this district to the north. The southern boundary of this district is the railroad tracks that run parallel to the Housatonic River. The eastern boundary of the district is Laurel Hill, a wooded park overlooking the town, and the western boundary is a terraced shelf in the plains of the river. The district includes properties on Depot, Elm, Maple, and South Streets, and Laurel Lane. Unlike Main Street, this district consists of more densely place residences, and narrower roads containing businesses just off Main Street. Its buildings were mostly constructed during the late 19th and early 20th centuries, and partially reflect Elm Street's function as an industrial part of the town. The district was added to the National Register of Historic Places in 2004.

Stockbridge was founded in the 1730s as a "Praying Indian" community, with its main settlement where the downtown area is now. South Street began as a Native American trail leading to the south, crossing the river at a fordable location. A bridge was first built near where the modern bridge now stands in 1744. The junction of Main and South Streets became a major local commercial nexus by later in the 18th century, with the area closer to the river where small industries began to flourish. One of Berkshire County's first printing operations was begun in this area, and there was by the mid-19th century a blacksmithy. A few houses stood in the area by the turn of the 19th century, but it was not until the 1850s that a significant number of houses began to be built south of Main Street. Many of these were populated by people engaged in trades for travelers, or otherwise engaged in business on Main Street. One of the older houses and the largest in the district, the Tidmarsh-Edwards House at 8 South Street, has had a number of notable residents, including politician and businessman John Z. Goodrich.

== See also ==
- National Register of Historic Places listings in Berkshire County, Massachusetts
- Norman Rockwell, whose studio was originally at 8 South Street
