= Maple Avenue Historic District (Cambridge, Massachusetts) =

Historic district in Massachusetts, United States

- U.S. National Register of Historic Places
- U.S. Historic district
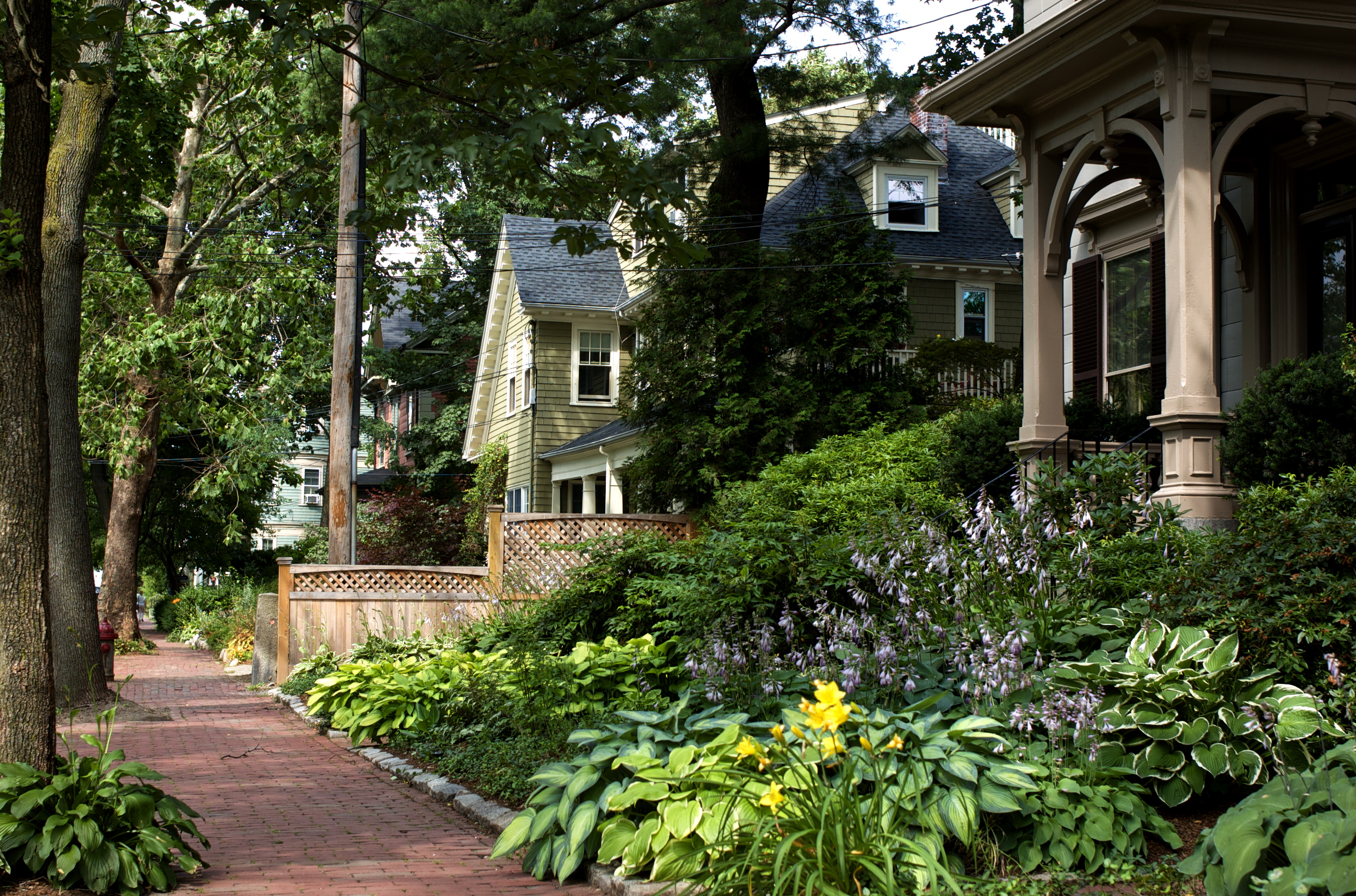

- Location within Massachusetts Location within the United States
- Location: Cambridge, Massachusetts
- Coordinates: 42°22′20″N 71°6′18″W
- Architectural style: Colonial Revival, Late Victorian
- MPS: Cambridge MRA
- NRHP reference No.: 83000816
- Added to NRHP: June 30, 1983

The Maple Avenue Historic District is a residential historic district on Maple Avenue between Marie Avenue and Broadway in Cambridge, Massachusetts, United States. It encompasses a street with a cohesive collection of well-preserved, predominantly Italianate and Second Empire, houses, in which the original spacing and setting have been preserved. It includes houses on both sides of Maple Avenue, numbered from 8 to 33, among which stand several Queen Anne and Colonial Revival houses. The district was added to the National Register of Historic Places in 1983.

== Description and history ==
Maple Avenue is located in central Cambridge, within a triangular area demarcated by Harvard Square, Central Square, and Inman Square. It runs between Cambridge Street, which connects Harvard and Inman Squares, and Broadway, which connects Harvard and Kendall Squares. This area was first developed residentially in the mid-19th century. Lining both sides of the middle area of Maple Avenue are fifteen houses whose scale and setting typify the development of that period.

All of the houses are wood frame structures, and all but one are two stories in height. One house is a duplex. Five houses are Second Empire in style, typically with slate mansard roofs, bracketed cornices, and ornate window and porch details. There are two Italianate houses, each with flushboarded facades and elaborately decorated entry porches. Some of the later houses have Queen Anne styling, but most of the remaining housing stock is Colonial Revival in character. The properties are characterized by relatively generous lot sizes, especially in comparison to the immediately surrounding properties.

== See also ==
- National Register of Historic Places listings in Cambridge, Massachusetts
