= Argyle Street (Chicago) =

Neighborhood and street in Illinois, United States

- Neighborhood and street
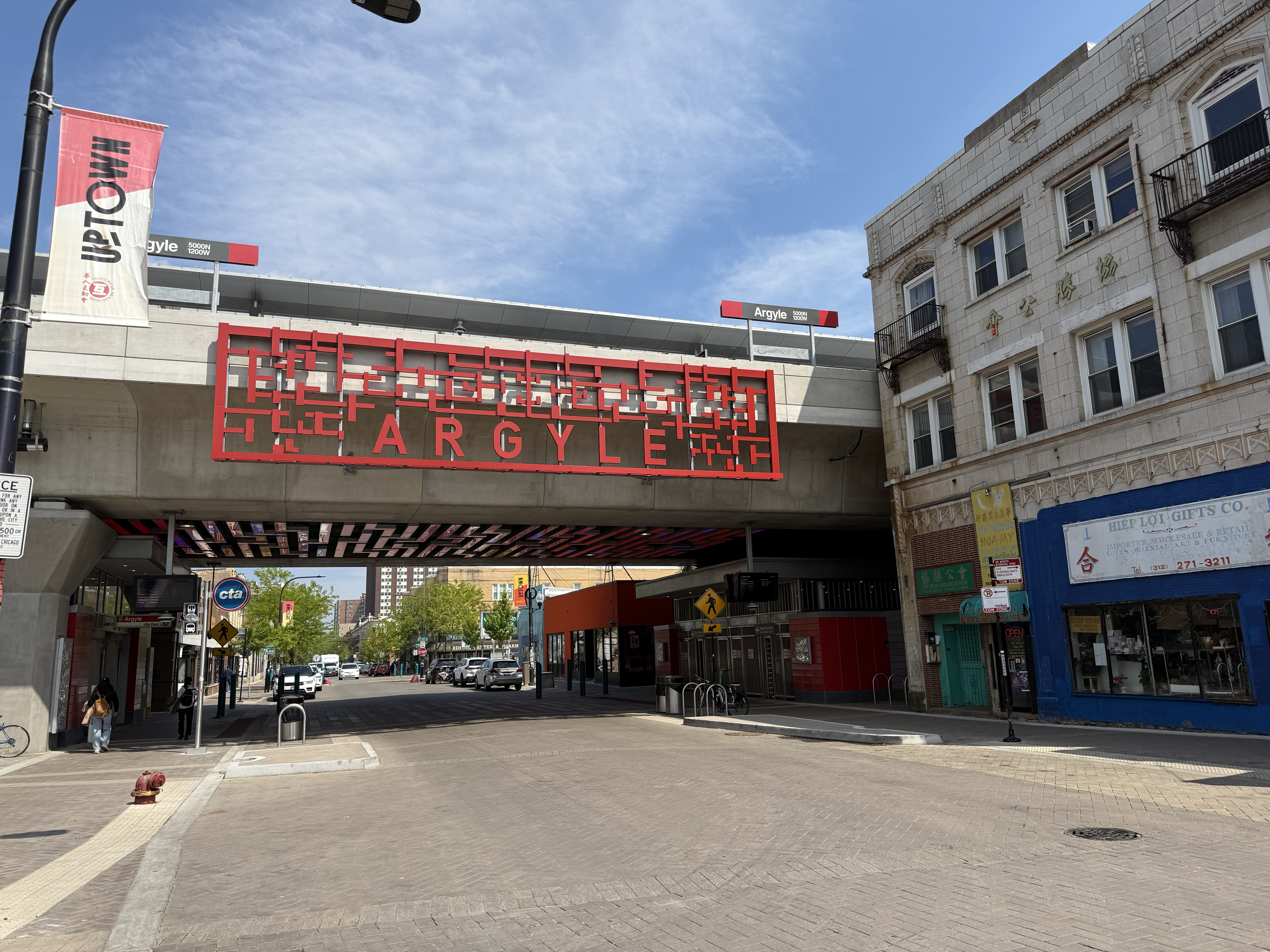
- Interactive map of Argyle Street
- Coordinates: 41°58′24″N 87°39′26″W,
- Country: United States
- State: Illinois
- County: Cook County
- City: Chicago
- Boroughs: List: Uptown, Chicago
- Time zone: UTC-6 (CST)
  - Summer (DST): UTC-5 (CDT)
- ZIP Codes: 60640

U.S. National Register of Historic Places
- Official name: West Argyle Street Historic District
- Type: Historic district
- Designated: June 3, 2010
- Reference no.: 10000311
- Architect: Multiple

Argyle Street is an east-west street in Uptown on the Far Northeast side of Chicago. The street name also refers to the surrounding area variously known as Asia on Argyle, Little Saigon, and New Chinatown. The neighborhood is approximately bounded by Foster Avenue to the north, Glenwood Avenue to the east, Ainslie Street to the south, and Sheridan Road to the west.

== History ==
=== Argyle Park ===
The neighborhood was established in the 1880s as a suburb called Argyle Park, named by Chicago Alderman and developer James A. Campbell for his ancestors the Dukes of Argyll in Scotland. Development was centered on a station on the new Chicago & Evanston line of the Chicago, Milwaukee and St. Paul Railway that opened in May 1885.

The village, along with the rest of the Lake View Township, was annexed to Chicago in 1889. In 1908 the Northwestern Elevated Railroad was extended north from Wilson Avenue, using the tracks of the Chicago, Milwaukee & St. Paul Railroad, This linked the suburb into Chicago's 'L' network, and the area became popular with people of limited means who wanted to live on the Lake Michigan shore. The railroad tracks were elevated onto an embankment between 1914 and 1922.

Many Austro-Hungarian Jewish immigrants settled in the area in the early twentieth century. In 1922, the Jewish community commissioned Henry Dubin to construct the Agudas Achim North Shore Synagogue, which Preservation Chicago describes as "the last grand Chicago synagogue" due to its "magnificent" combination of Romanesque-Revival, Spanish and Art Deco styles; the building was converted into apartments in 2016. Following World War II, the Selfhelp Home—a charity founded to serve Holocaust refugees and survivors—opened a senior home at 908 W Argyle.

=== New Chinatown ===
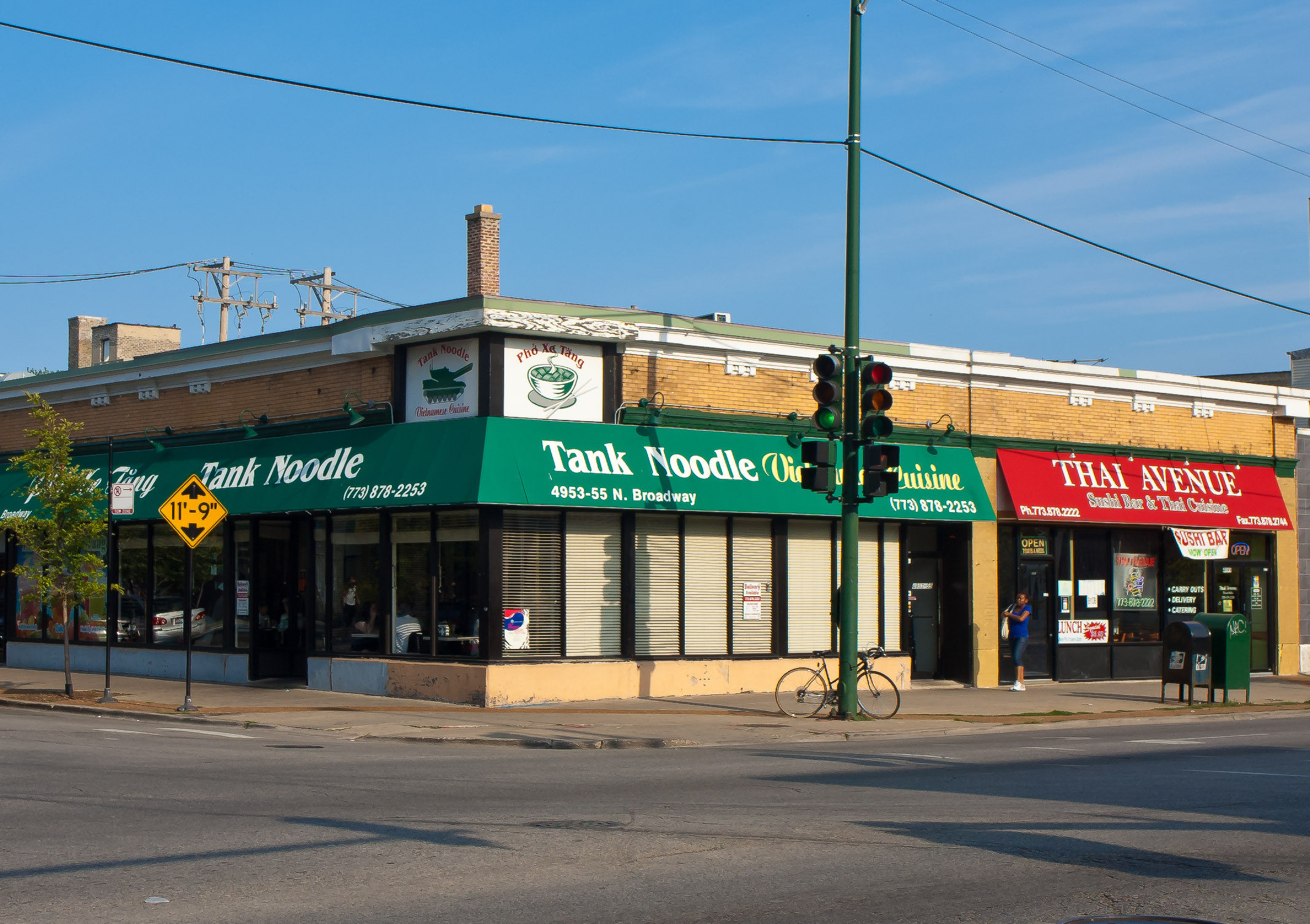
Vietnamese and Thai restaurants at the corner of Argyle Street and Broadway

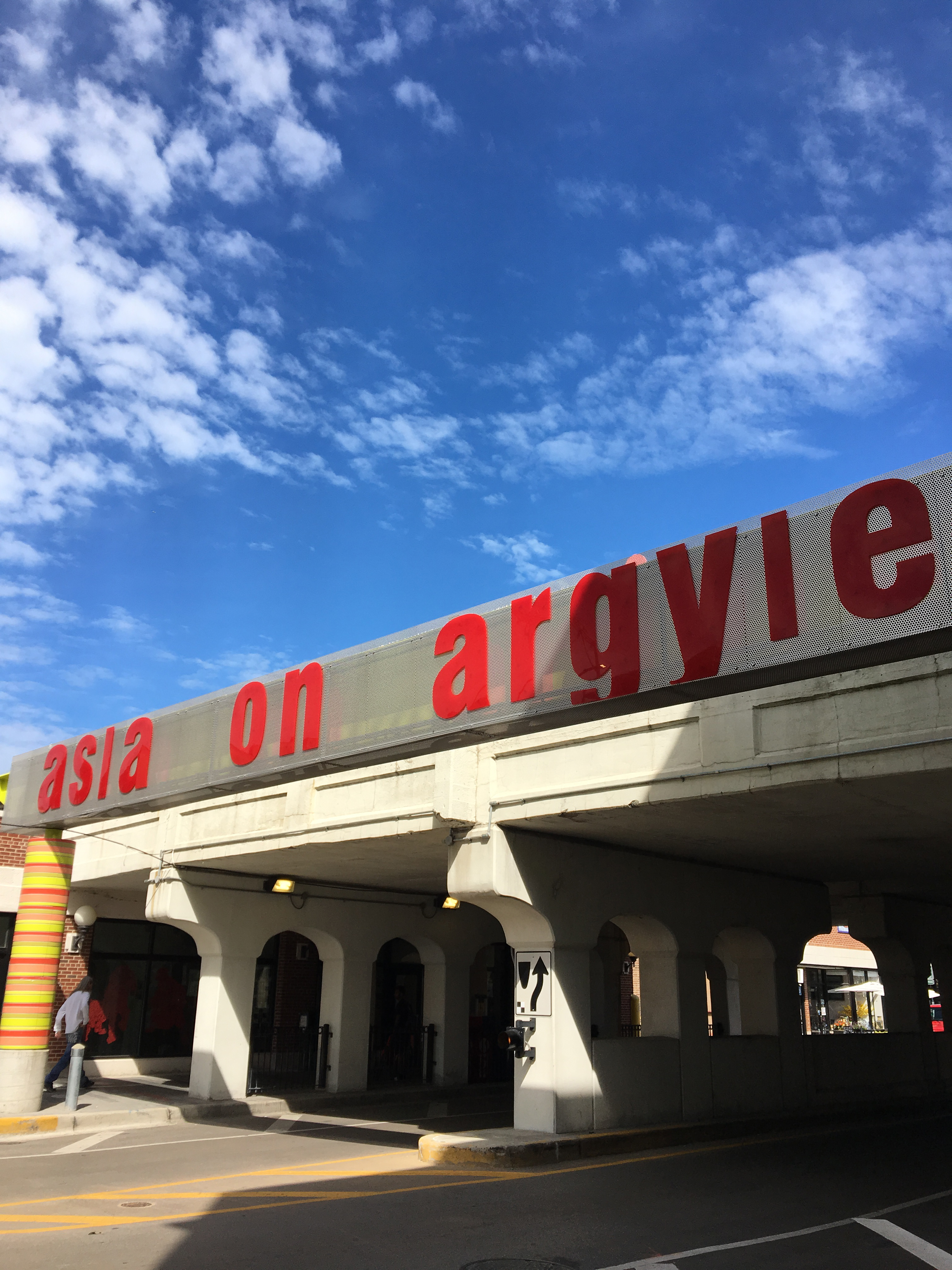
Former "Asia on Argyle" sign

Chicago restaurateur Jimmy Wong bought property in the area in the 1960s and planned its rebirth as New Chinatown. He envisioned a mall with pagodas, trees and reflecting ponds to replace the empty storefronts. The Hip Sing Association, a Chinese cultural group, moved its Chicago offices to Argyle Street in 1971, and by 1974 Wong and the Hip Sing Association owned 80% of the three-block stretch on Argyle. Wong had an accident and broke both hips, leaving him unable to follow through on his plans. In 1979 Charlie Soo, founder of the Asian American Small Business Association, took up the cause, and the area developed not solely as a Chinese enclave but also including Vietnamese, Lao, Cambodian, and Japanese businesses. Soo campaigned to get the Chicago Transit Authority to give the Argyle 'L' station a $250,000 face-lift, then in 1981 he started the "Taste of Argyle," an annual food festival. He also secured funds from Chicago Mayor Jane Byrne to fix the sidewalks, and later from Mayor Harold Washington to repair building facades. Because of his tireless work in promoting the neighborhood, Soo would later be known as the unofficial "Mayor of Argyle Street." By 1986 it was estimated that Uptown had about 8,000 Chinese and Vietnamese residents.

The concentration of Vietnamese restaurants, bakeries and shops, as well as Chinese, Cambodian, Laotian and Thai businesses along Argyle Street, centered on the Argyle 'L' station, has led to the neighborhood being nicknamed New Chinatown, Little Saigon, or Little Vietnam.

On June 3, 2010, the area roughly bounded by Broadway to the west, Winona Street to the north, Sheridan Road to the east, and Ainslie Street to the south was entered into the National Register of Historic Places. The historic district covers an area of about 41 acres (0.17 km^{2}).

The name "Asia on Argyle" became popular in the area around 2013 with official city sponsored re-branding of the retail corridor on Argyle Street with a distinctive sign installed over the Argyle 'L" station. The sign was removed as part of the CTA Red and Purple Modernization Project but the name is still used by the community.
