= Maple Street Historic District (Lewisburg, West Virginia) =

Historic district in West Virginia, United States

- U.S. National Register of Historic Places
- U.S. Historic district
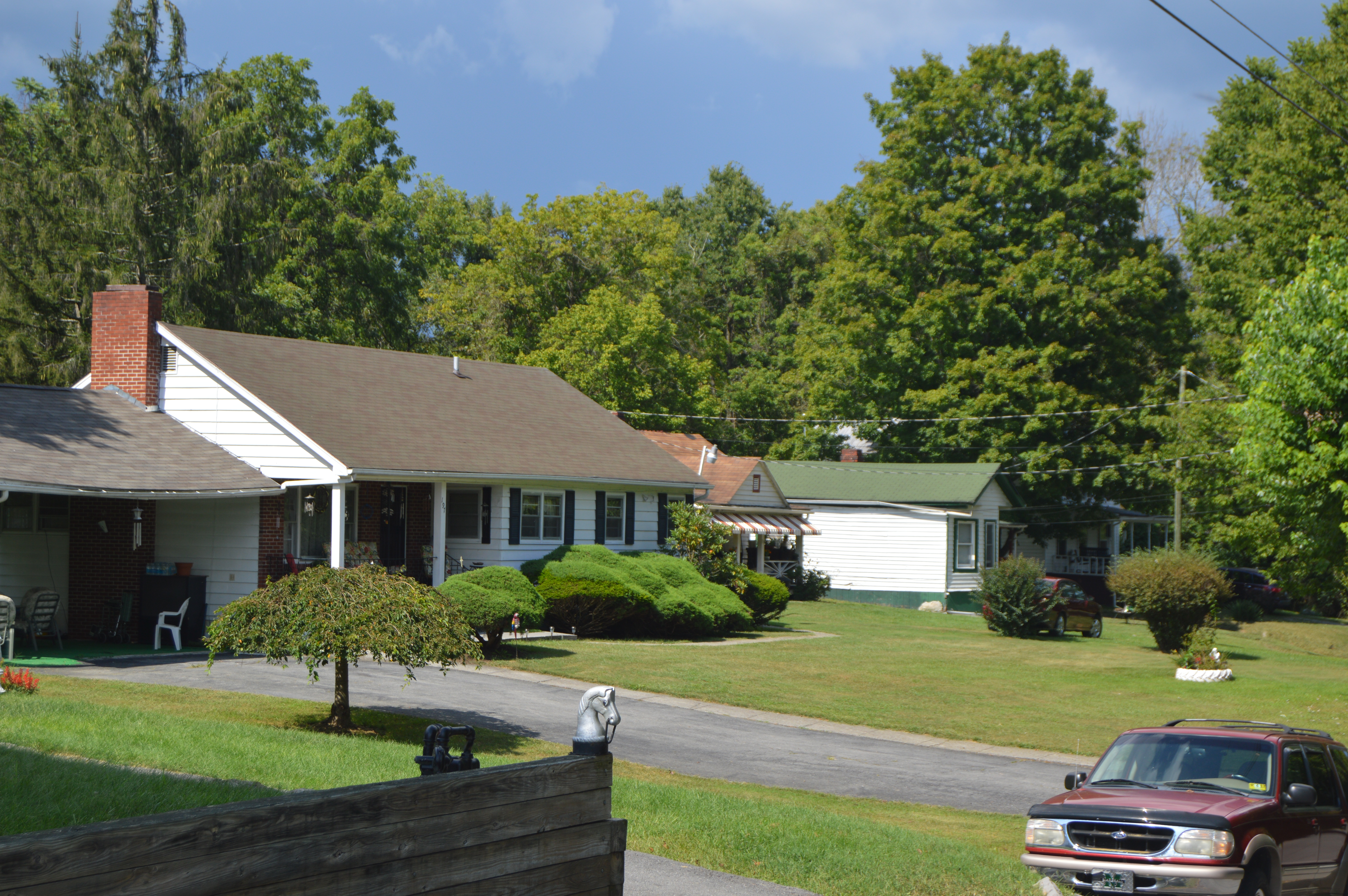
- Houses in the southern part of the district

- Location within West Virginia Location within the United States
- Location: 107-121 Maple St., Lewisburg, West Virginia
- Coordinates: 37°48′17″N 80°27′0″W
- Area: 4 acres (1.6 ha)
- Built: c. 1900
- NRHP reference No.: 87002529
- Added to NRHP: April 6, 1988

Maple Street Historic District is a national historic district located on "Gospel Hill" at Lewisburg, Greenbrier County, West Virginia. The district encompasses six contributing buildings, all single family residences. They are stylistically "worker's houses" of the type that are to be seen in many coal and timber company towns throughout West Virginia. They are one and two story frame dwellings with gable or hipped roofs, built about 1900.

It was listed on the National Register of Historic Places in 1987.
