= Maple Street Historic District (Battle Creek, Michigan) =

- U.S. National Register of Historic Places
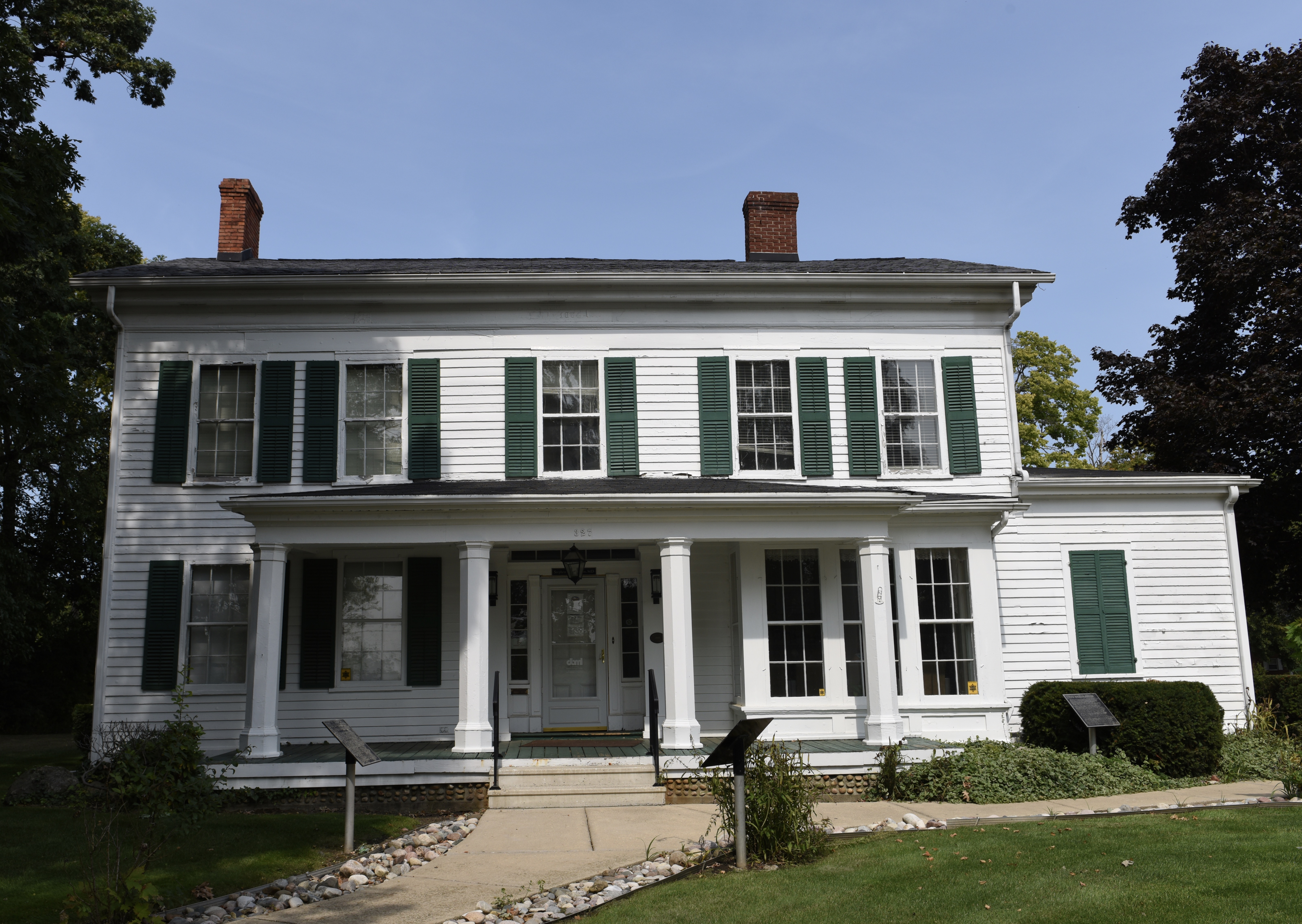
- Charles Merritt House (327 N Capital)
- Interactive map
- Location: 161-342 Capital Ave., NE, Battle Creek, Michigan
- Coordinates: 42°19′22″N 85°10′23″W
- Area: 17 acres (6.9 ha)
- Architect: Geo. F. Barber, Adelbert B. Chanel, et al.
- Architectural style: Queen Anne, Colonial Revival, Italianate
- NRHP reference No.: 96000806
- Added to NRHP: July 25, 1996

The Maple Street Historic District is a residential historic district located at 161-342 Capital Avenue NE in Battle Creek, Michigan. It was listed on the National Register of Historic Places in 1996.

== History ==
In 1835, Jonathan Hart and Joseph, Abraham, and Isaac Merritt purchased this site to establish a farm. In 1836 they platted what is now the heart of Battle Creek. As the settlement grew, Hart and the Merritts platted more of their property; in all of these plats, the lots fronting on Maple were unusually wide and deep. Beginning in the 1840s, Battle Creeks most distinguished residents built houses along Maple. These began with Jonathan Hart's own house, constructed in 1846, and Charles Merritt's, dating from the 1850s. By 1873, many of these lots had been filled. However, the area retained its cachet as a fashionable area to live, and over the next four decades many of these houses were expanded, substantially remodeled, or replaced, such that only three of the houses extant in 1873 are still in place in a recognizable form.

Residents of the Maple Street Historic District included not only Merritt and Hart, but more of the Merritt family and other leading Battle Creek citizens of the late 19th and early 20th century. These include dry-goods merchant Benjamin F. Hinman, theatre owner Col. Walter Scott Butterfield, manufacturers Brainard Skinner, John Nichols, Irving L. Stone, and George Rich, as well as C. W. Post's daughter Marjorie Merriweather Post.

== Description ==
The Maple Street Historic District contains 46 residential buildings, of which 38 contribute to the historic character of the neighborhood. Of these, 24 are houses, twelve are associated garages or carriage houses, and two are churches. These houses are primarily substantial structures built on large city lots, and date from a late nineteenth and early twentieth century. Architectural styles are predominantly Italianate, Queen Anne, and Neoclassical, with a few Greek Revival, Colonial Revival, and Arts-and-Crafts inspired houses mixed in. Some of the houses have associated carriage houses or garages in the rear. The streets of the district are lined with old trees, primarily maple.

== Gallery ==
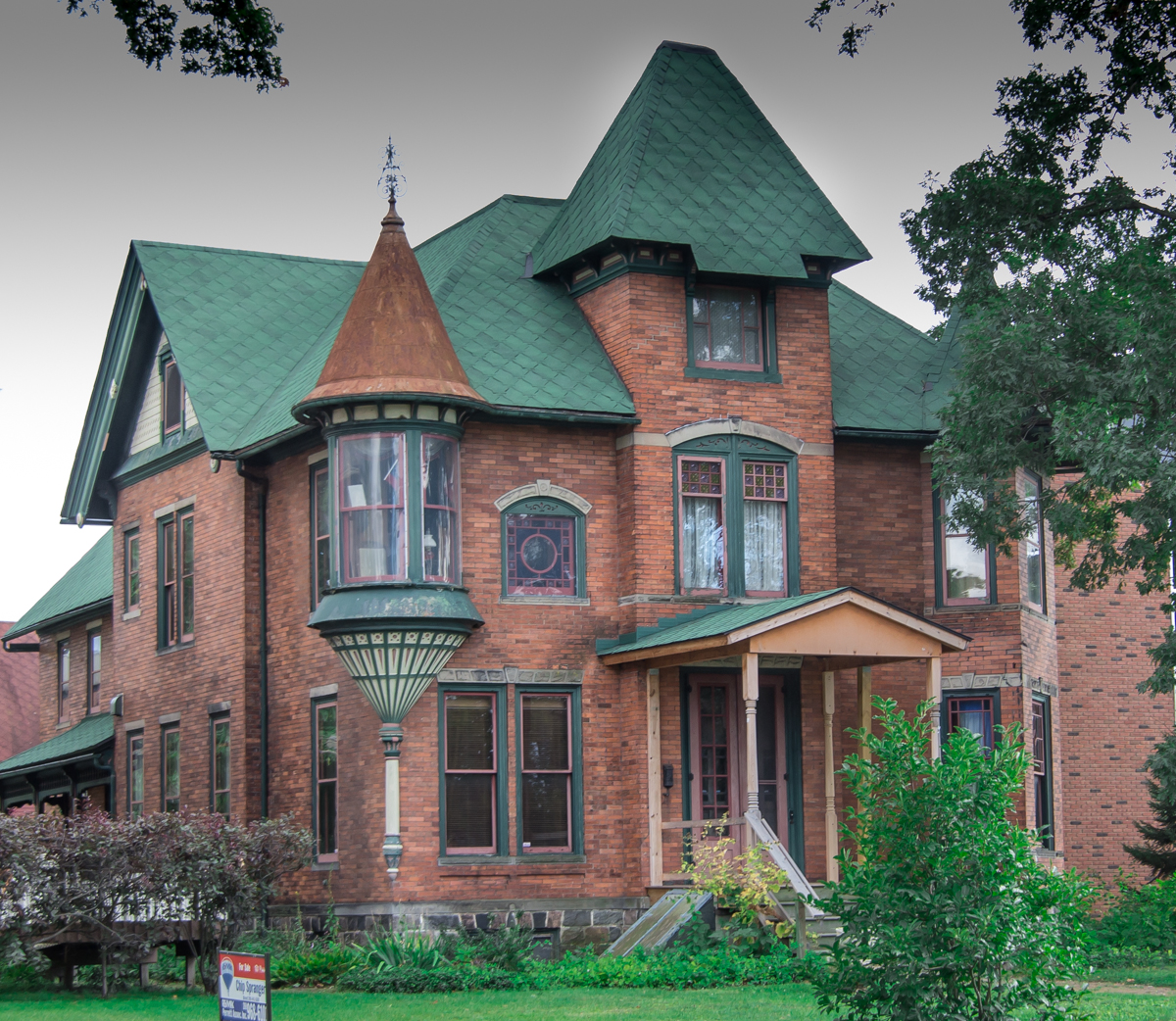
Kimball House (196 Capital)

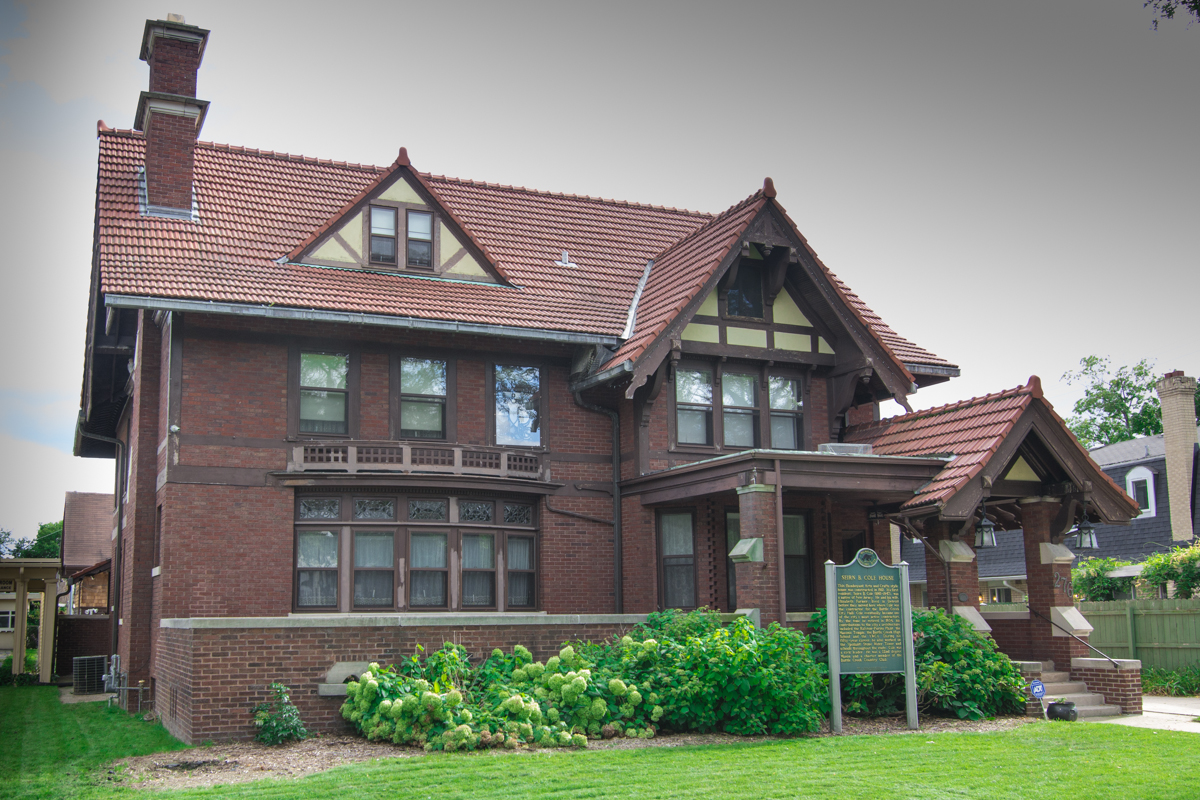
Seirn Cole House (145 Capital)
