= Windsor Court Historic District =

Historic district in Massachusetts, United States

- U.S. National Register of Historic Places
- U.S. Historic district
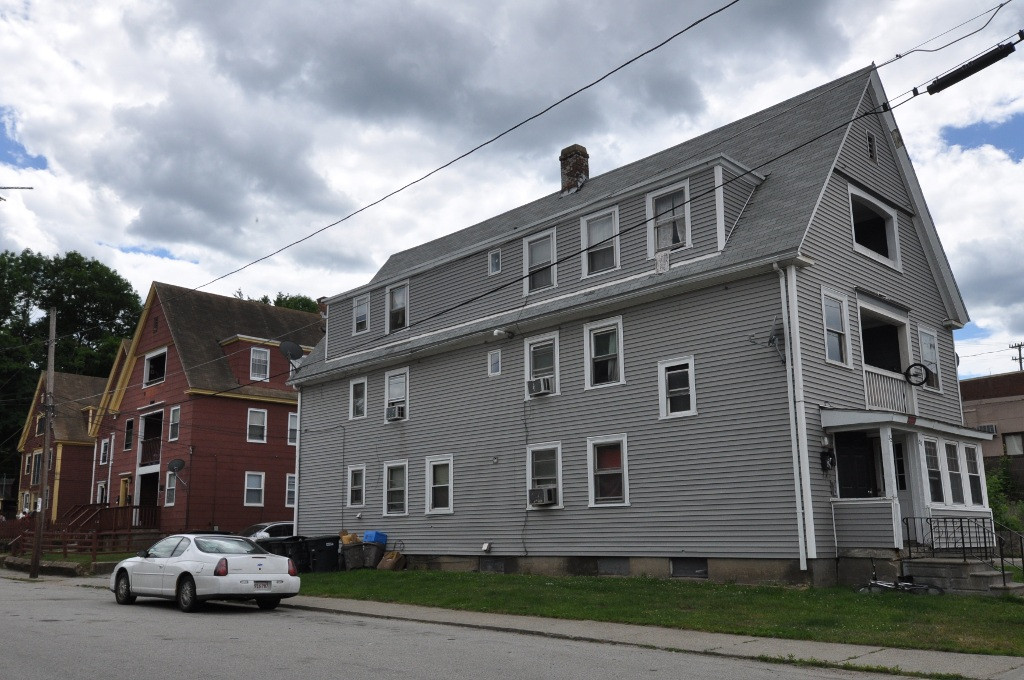

- Location within Massachusetts Location within the United States
- Location: Windsor Ct. at North St., Southbridge, Massachusetts
- Coordinates: 42°4′33″N 72°1′52″W
- MPS: Southbridge MRA
- NRHP reference No.: 89000596
- Added to NRHP: June 22, 1989

The Windsor Court Historic District is a residential historic district in Southbridge, Massachusetts, United States. It is a collection of five three-family residences located on Windsor Court and adjacent North Street that were built by the American Optical Company between 1915 and 1917 to provide worker housing. The district was listed on the National Register of Historic Places in 1989.

== Description and history ==
Windsor Court is a short spur road on the south side of North Street, which runs east–west north of Southbridge's downtown and south of the Quinebaug River. Between the road and the river stands part of the former manufacturing facility of the American Optical Company, once Southbridge's leading employer. Two of the five buildings in the district flank Windsor Court, facing south toward North Street, while the other three stand on the west side of Windsor Court. They are essentially identical in original construction, 2-1/2 story wood frame structures with gable roofs. They differ from traditional triple-decker construction in that they have gabled roofs and Colonial Revival styling. Distinctive features include corner pilasters and recessed porches, some of which have since been enclosed. Although the roofline starts at the second floor, the houses have dormers that run most of the length of the structure, giving the third floor unit additional space. These features are similar to those found in another cluster of company housing on Twinehurst Place.

These houses typified the densest form of residential housing built by the American Optical Company to house its workers. These buildings were built between 1915 and 1917, and were rented to workers at $7 per month for the lower units, and $6 for the third floor.

== See also ==
- National Register of Historic Places listings in Southbridge, Massachusetts
- National Register of Historic Places listings in Worcester County, Massachusetts
