= House at 68 Maple Street =

Historic house in Massachusetts, United States

- U.S. National Register of Historic Places
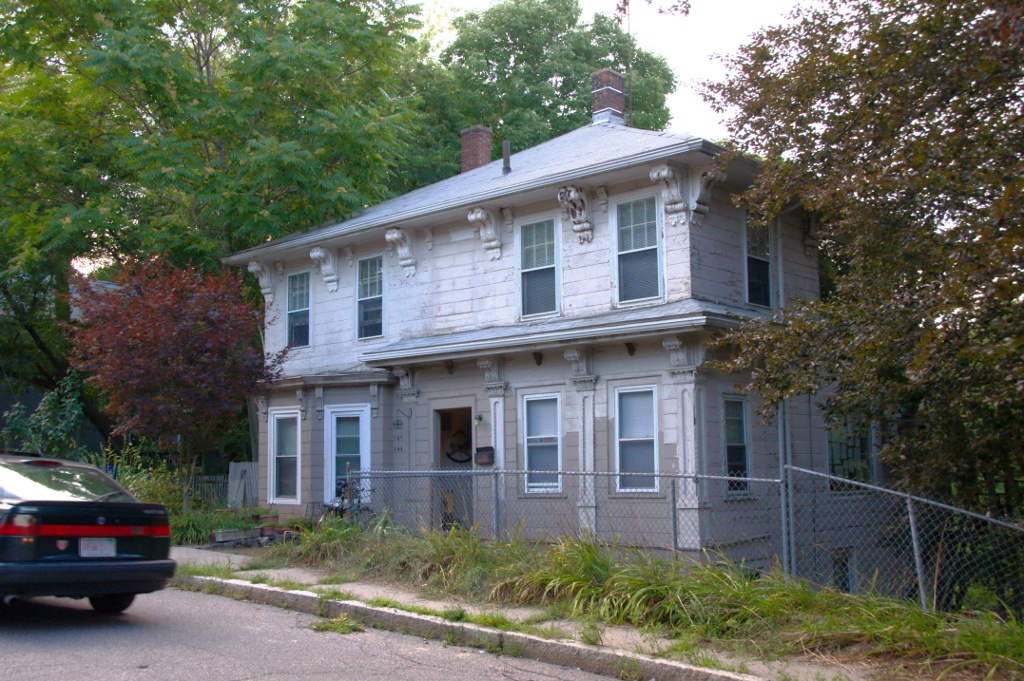

- Location within Massachusetts Location within the United States
- Location: 68 Maple Street, Newton, Massachusetts
- Coordinates: 42°21′36″N 71°10′58″W
- Built: 1847
- Architectural style: Italianate
- MPS: Newton MRA
- NRHP reference No.: 86001963
- Added to NRHP: September 4, 1986

The House at 68 Maple Street is an historic building located on the corner of Maple Street and Nonantum Road in the village of Newton Corner, in Newton, Massachusetts. Built in the late 1840s, the two-story wood-frame building is a rare local example of a vernacular square hip-roofed Italianate house. Its most prominent features are its overscaled brackets, which decorate both the extended eaves and the roof line of the bay on the front facade.

On September 4, 1986, it was added to the National Register of Historic Places.

== See also ==
- National Register of Historic Places listings in Newton, Massachusetts
