= Maple Avenue Historic District (Hannibal, Missouri) =

Historic district in Missouri, United States

- U.S. National Register of Historic Places
- U.S. Historic district
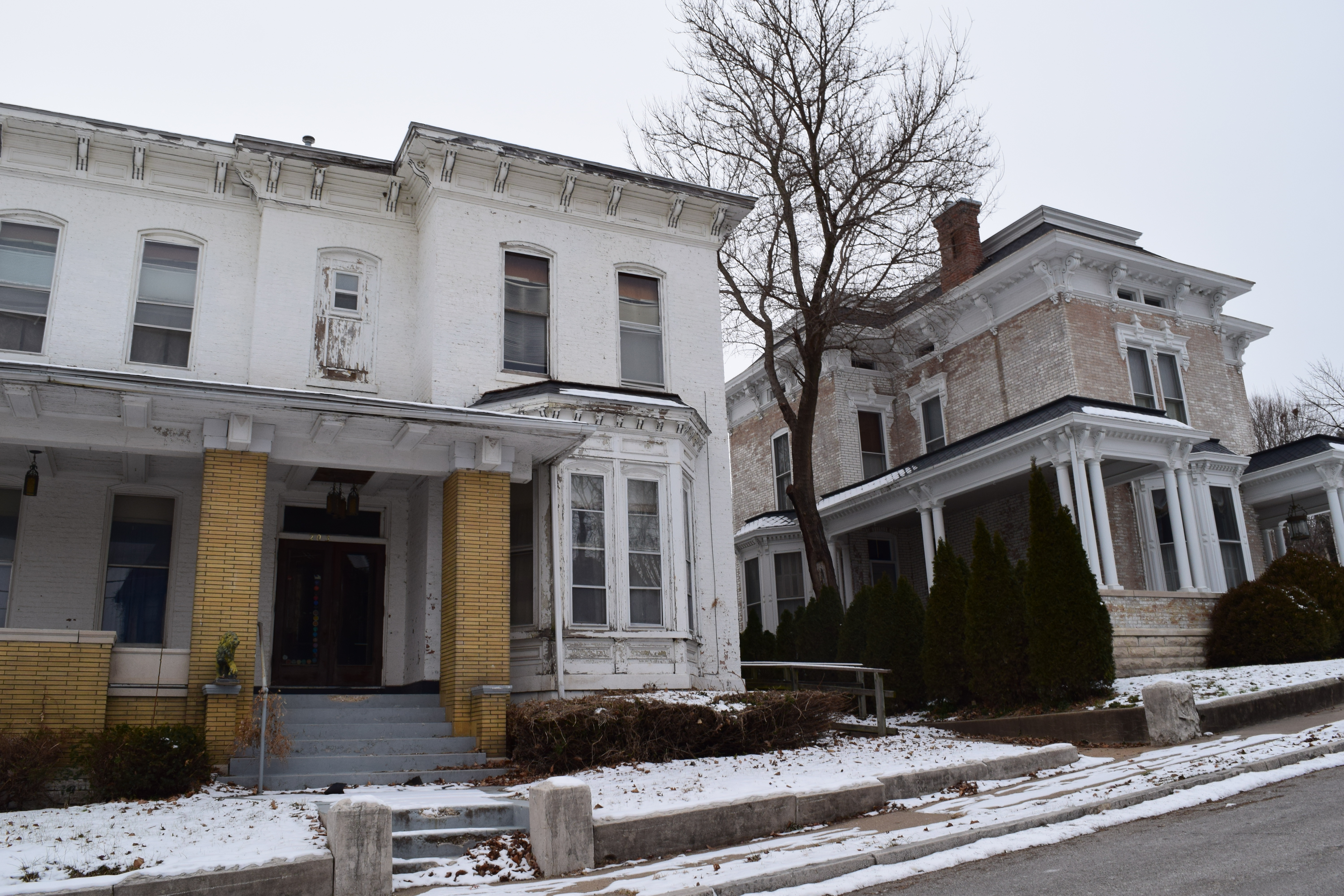

- Location within Missouri Location within the United States
- Location: Roughly bounded by Broadway and Center St., Alley to North St., Dulany to Section, Hannibal, Missouri
- Coordinates: 39°42′32″N 91°21′36″W
- Area: 46 acres (19 ha)
- Built by: Hogg, John Oliver
- Architect: Ittner, William B.
- Architectural style: Federal, Italianate, et al.
- NRHP reference No.: 02001404
- Added to NRHP: November 21, 2002

Maple Avenue Historic District is a national historic district located at Hannibal, Marion County, Missouri. The district encompasses 148 contributing buildings in a predominantly residential section of Hannibal. It developed between about 1850 and 1950, and includes representative examples of Federal, Italianate, Late Victorian, Colonial Revival, and Bungalow / American Craftsman architecture. Located in the district are the separately listed Ebert-Dulany House, Rockcliffe Mansion, and Eighth and Center Streets Baptist Church. Other notable buildings include Central School by William B. Ittner, Pilgrim Congregational Church, McKnight House, Cliffside, Hogg House, the McVeigh House, the Mclntyre House, the Settles House, and the Clayton House.

It was listed on the National Register of Historic Places in 2002.
