= House at 111 E. Maple Street =

Historic house in Iowa, United States

- U.S. National Register of Historic Places
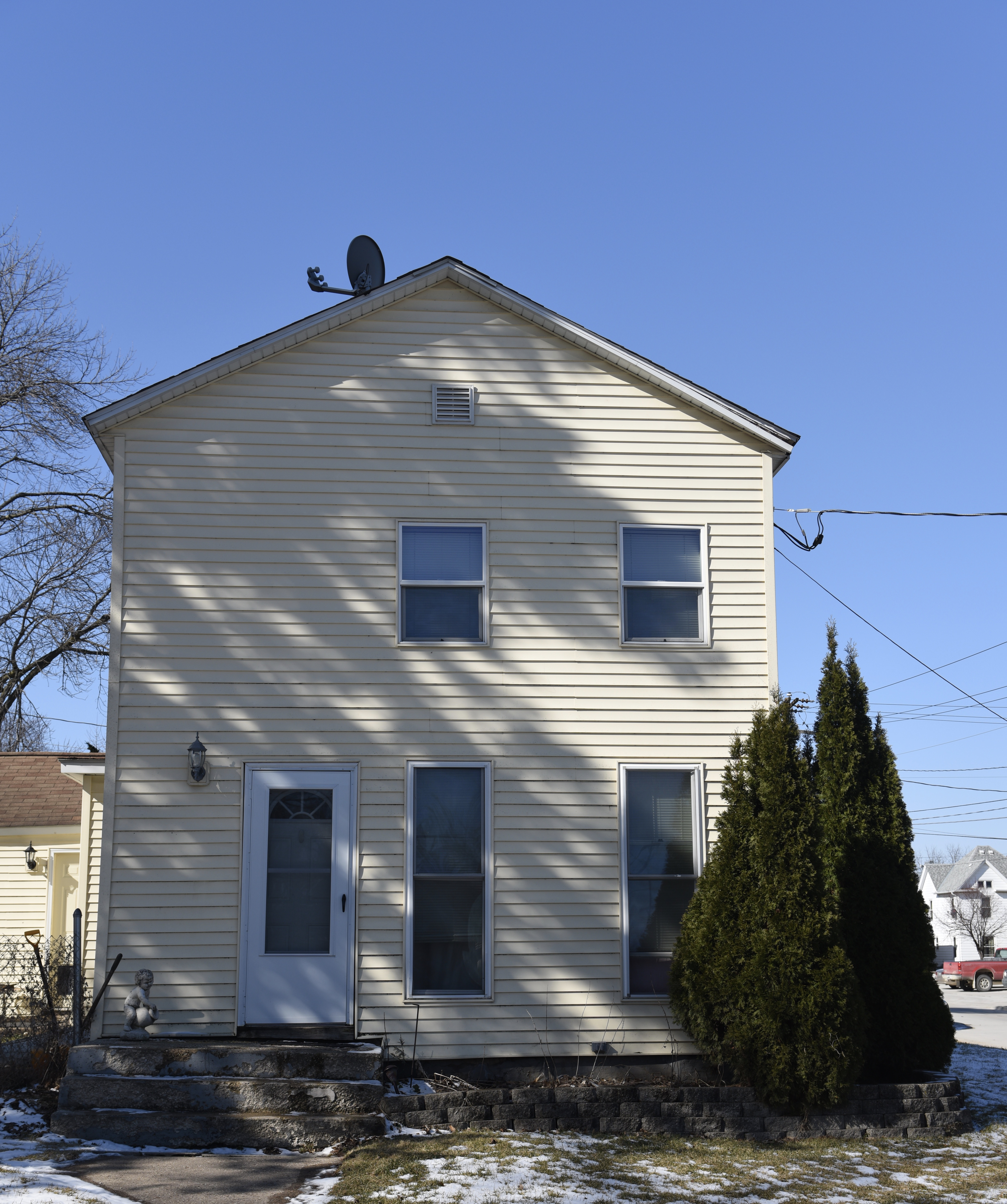

- Location within Iowa Location within the United States
- Location: 111 E. Maple St., Maquoketa, Iowa
- Coordinates: 42°03′56″N 90°39′54″W
- Area: less than one acre
- Built: c. 1855
- Architectural style: Greek Revival
- MPS: Maquoketa MPS
- NRHP reference No.: 91000959
- Added to NRHP: August 9, 1991

111 East Maple Street is a historic house located at the address of the same name in Maquoketa, Iowa.

== Description and history ==
This is one of five Greek Revival houses in Maquoketa that represent its earliest extant houses built during its early growth period. Built in about 1855, it features a gable end facade, cornice returns, and slightly pedimented framing on the door and window openings. Most of these features have been subsequently covered by siding. This property was bought by Jonas Clark from John and Eliza Goodenow in 1850. Three years later they ran against each other for mayor with Goodenow winning 32–17. Clark, who was one of the first settlers here, worked as a shop keeper and a stable keeper and would go on to represent Ward 4 as an alderman.

The house was listed on the National Register of Historic Places on August 9, 1991.
