= Henry Dubin House =

Historic house in Illinois, United States

- U.S. National Register of Historic Places
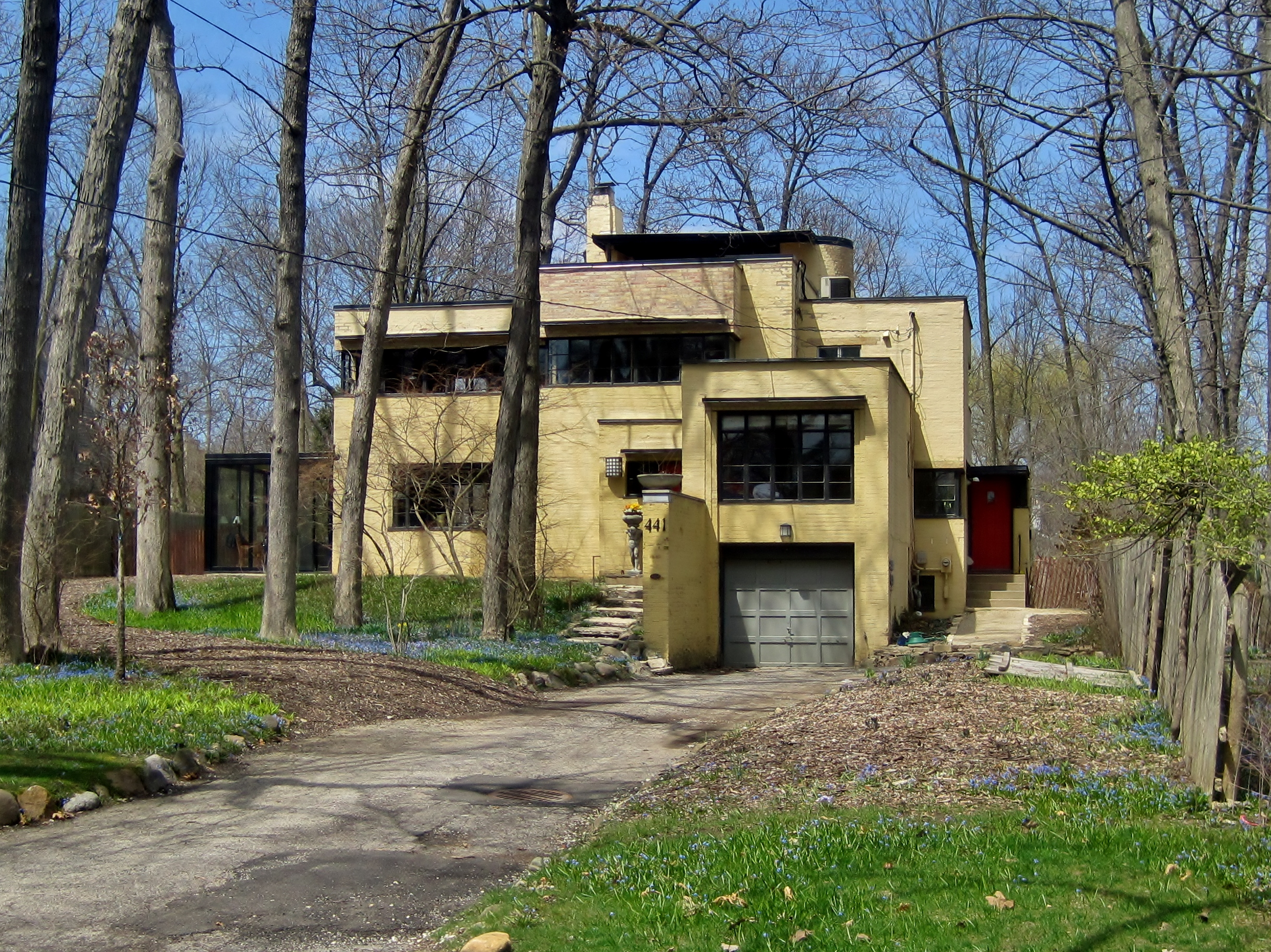

- Location within Illinois Location within the United States
- Location: 441 Cedar, Highland Park, Illinois
- Coordinates: 42°10′19″N 87°47′12″W
- Area: 2 acres (0.81 ha)
- Built: 1930
- Architect: Dubin, Henry
- Architectural style: International Style
- MPS: Highland Park MRA
- NRHP reference No.: 82002558
- Added to NRHP: September 29, 1982

The Henry Dubin House (also known as the Battledeck House) is an architecturally-significant house in Highland Park, Illinois, United States.

== History ==
Henry Dubin was an architect who studied at the University of Illinois at Urbana-Champaign, graduating in 1915. He then worked for four years under Holabird & Roche. He then left the firm to start his own, Dubin & Eisenberg. In 1922, he designed the Agudas Achim North Shore Synagogue in Chicago, which Preservation Chicago describes as "the last grand Chicago synagogue" and a "magnificent" combination of Romanesque-Revival, Spanish and Art Deco styles. In 1928, Dubin left the United States to study at Bauhaus. He returned to Highland Park, Illinois after a year of study. Dubin designed a house for himself in 1929 and completed it a year later. The house kept him occupied during the first few years of the Great Depression, once commissioned ceased due to the economic times.

The house was one of the first International Style buildings in the town. It was nicknamed the "Battledeck House" because the steel plate of the roof and floor resembled the construction of a ship. It was completely fireproof: the exterior was constructed of clinker brick and steel. Dubin chose this design because he anticipated a need for housing the poor following the Wall Street crash of 1929. Dubin was impressed with the ability of Pullman cars to withstand a variety of temperatures, particularly after reading an essay by Sigfried Giedion. He sought an affordable style of house that could be prefabricated and sold throughout the country. The interior featured recessed radiators, built-in furniture, and a simple dado. It was one of the first flat-roofed houses in the Chicago area.

On September 29, 1982, the house was recognized by the National Park Service with a listing on the National Register of Historic Places.
