= Clay Beauford =

United States army officer and frontiersman (1846–1905)

- Clay Beauford in Tombstone, Arizona, c. 1875
- Born: Welford Chapman Bridwell; September 27, 1846; Washington County, Maryland, United States
- Died: February 1, 1905 (aged 58); Los Angeles, California, United States
- Burial place: Angelus-Rosedale Memorial Park
- Military career
- Allegiance: United States of America; Confederate States of America
- Branch: United States Army
- Service years: 1861–65 (CSA); 1869–1873 (USA)
- Rank: First Sergeant
- Unit: 5th U.S. Cavalry
- Conflicts: Indian Wars; *Comanche Campaign; *Apache Wars; American Civil War; *Battle of Gettysburg
- Awards: Medal of Honor
- Other work: Chief of the San Carlos Apache Police (4 years)

Clay Beauford (born Welford Chapman Bridwell; September 27, 1846 – February 1, 1905) was an American army officer, scout and frontiersman. An ex-Confederate soldier in his youth, he later enlisted in the U.S. Army and served with the 5th U.S. Cavalry during the Indian Wars against the Plains Indians from 1869 to 1873. He acted as a guide for Lieutenant Colonel George Crook in his "winter campaign" against the Apaches and received the Medal of Honor for his conduct.

From 1874 to 1877, Beauford served under Indian agent John Clum as chief of scouts and captain of the San Carlos Apache Police. He and Clum are credited for the capture of Geronimo at Ojo Caliente in 1877 and he is largely responsible for turning the San Carlos police into one of the most respected law enforcement agencies in the Southwestern United States during the frontier era.

He became a successful rancher and prospector in the years following his retirement. A popular pioneering figure during his lifetime, Beauford was briefly elected to Arizona's territorial legislature in 1885 to represent Graham County. Mount Buford in Maricopa County is named in his honor.

== Early life ==
Beauford was born Welford Chapman Bridwell in Washington County, Maryland on September 27, 1846, and later moved with his family to neighboring Virginia. At age 14, upon the start of the American Civil War, he ran away from home to join the Confederate Army. He enlisted under an alias, Clay Beauford, partly because of his age and to avoid being brought back home by his father. Beauford initially spent the first year of the war as a drummer boy with General Robert E. Lee's Army of Northern Virginia, however, he became a regular infantryman within a year. In 1863, he saw action at Battle of Gettysburg and was among the 4,500 men who took part in Pickett's Charge. He was wounded in at least three other engagements before the end of the war: a gunshot wound to his kneecap, a second to his left hand, and a third which penetrated near the stomach.

== Military career ==
In 1869, while living in Nashville, Tennessee, Beauford enlisted in the U.S. Army. He was assigned to Company B of the 5th U.S. Cavalry and took part in a number of Indian campaigns in Kansas, Nebraska, and the Wyoming Territory. Within a year of his enlistment, he received honorable mention from his commanding officer, Lieutenant Colonel Thomas Duncan, for bravery at the Battle of Prairie Dog Creek on September 26, 1869. Beauford remained with the 5th Cavalry throughout his military career and had risen to the rank of first sergeant by the time he was posted to the Arizona Territory three years later. He was praised by Captain Robert H. Montgomery on September 26, 1872, following a battle against the Apache in the Red Rock area. He also served under Lieutenant Colonel George Crook during his "winter campaign" against renegade Apaches, particularly the Western Apache and Yavapai bands in the Tonto Basin, and helped guide Crook's columns during the expedition. Beauford was one of 22 men, 12 cavalrymen and 10 Apache Scouts, who were cited for "gallant conduct during the campaigns and engagements with Apaches" awarded the Medal of Honor; he and fellow troopers Sergeants James Bailey and James H. Turpin were the only members of the 5th Cavalry to be recipients. Beauford did not receive the award until April 12, 1875, two years after being discharged from service.

Beauford later claimed that his last year in the military was physically the hardest of his life being on almost constant patrol in the Arizona frontier. One of his later exploits was the capture of White Mountain Apache chieftain Toga-da-chuz and his family, including his son the future The Apache Kid, which he brought back to the San Carlos reservation. He continued working as a civilian scout for the army until the spring of 1875.

== San Carlos Police Chief ==
When Indian agent John Philip Clum was appointed head of the San Carlos Apache Indian Reservation in 1874, Beauford accepted Clum's offer to become chief of the San Carlos Apache Police. Tasked with keeping the peace among the more than 4,000 Native Americans then living on the reservation, many of whom did not get along with each other, Beauford was considered ideal for the position given his years of experience as a guide and scout, his knowledge of the Apache language, and his reputation among the Apache themselves. Through a skilled Indian fighter, he had "conceived a deep sympathy for them" and the Virginian's flamboyant personality "inspired Indians and was a natural leader".

Beauford, who had a "no-nonsense, hands-on, approach to supervision and administration", worked well with Clum to establish the San Carlos police force as an independent agency from the U.S. Army. It initially consisted four Apache scouts, however, this was later expanded to a permanent 25-man police force by the time he took command. These first recruits were hand-picked from the various tribes and bands on the reservation and armed with needle-guns and fixed ammunition. Beauford provided them with modest uniforms and taught them military drill formations. The small police force quickly became an excellent drill team and became very popular among the younger men on the reservation. Many were eager to join up and within a few months the reservation police had attracted hundreds of new officers. His efforts would eventually transform the San Carlos police department into one of the prominent law enforcement agencies in the American Southwest.

"In this connection I desire to mention that Mr. Clay Beauford has rendered most able services as a guide and scout with the Indian police. He is brave and energetic, a thorough Indian fighter, and when once he strikes a trail he never stops until he is victor in the renegade camp."

— John Philip Clum, U.S. Indian Agent for the San Carlos Apache Indian Reservation.

In December 1875, Beauford was the subject of a failed assassination attempt by Tonto Apache chief Disalin. Failing to kill John Clum and an agency clerk at the main building, Disalin made a last desperate bid to gun down the police chief. He found Beauford shortly after fleeing Clum's office. His first shot missed and, while moving closer to take a second shot, Disalin was shot and killed by an Indian police officer. Four months later, while investigating reports of intruders "prowling about the western border", he and a group of reservation police officers were involved in a gun battle which left 16 renegade Apaches dead. They brought 21 women and children back to San Carlos. Clum commended the actions of the officers and personally praised Beauford's abilities to Department of the Interior. He had a limited role in the concentration of Apaches from the Chiracahua and Fort Apache reservations at San Carlos.

On April 21, 1877, he headed the 102-man Apache police force, accompanied by John Clum, which captured Geronimo at Ojo Caliente and oversaw the subsequent transfer of the Warm Springs (or Mimbres) band to San Carlos, both occurring without violence from either side. He officially retired on September 1, 1877, two weeks after Clum's resignation, although he may have had occasional contact with the force up until at least 1880.

== Later years ==
Beauford became a cattle rancher after leaving the San Carlos reservation, establishing a homestead in Aravaipa Canyon he called "Spring Gardens". He also did some prospecting developing the "Arizona Mine" in the Aravaipa Mining District which he later sold at a good profit. In or around 1879, Beauford made the acquaintance of a young woman from Indianapolis, Indiana, Cedonia Alexander, who was visiting relatives in Fort Thomas. Their friendship eventually developed into a courtship and were married the following September. Prior to his engagement, he had his name legally changed back to his birth name, Welford Chapman Bridwell, by the 10th Territorial Legislative Assembly. A very popular and well-known figure in Arizona during his lifetime, it was said that "probably no other Arizona pioneer was more widely known or had a larger circle of friends". Author and historian Dan L. Thrapp described Beauford in his Encyclopedia of Frontier Biography as being "tall, slender, broad-shouldered, companionable, could sing a ballad to his own banjo accompaniment, and fairly well controlled 'a quick and violent temper'." Mount Buford, located 4 miles north of Kentuck Mountain in Maricopa County, is named in his honor.

He had a brief political career being elected to the council (or "upper house") of Arizona's territorial legislature as a delegate for Safford, Graham County in the 13th Assembly in 1885. It was during the session that Beauford was involved in a physical altercation in a Prescott saloon. While drinking in the saloon, he was approached by a French-born lobbyist for the Arizona Copper Company in Clifton, Professor Arnold, who "cast aspersions" on Beauford for renouncing his presumed French heritage by changing his name. Their argument escalated with Beauford finally striking Arnold to which the Frenchman challenged to a duel. Beauford agreed but the two were unable to agree on the weapons, Beauford choosing Colt revolvers while Arnold preferred French sabers, and with swords not readily available in Arizona the duel was eventually called off.

In 1895, Beauford moved his family to Los Angeles, California where they raised their young children. His only son Walter died at an early age, however, his daughter Nina became the wife of eminent physician Dr. Arthur F. Maisch in 1903. Beauford died in Los Angeles on February 1, 1905, at age 58, and interred in Angelus-Rosedale Memorial Park.

== In popular culture ==
Clay Beauford has appeared as a character in the following historical novels:

- The Bubbling Spring (1949) by Ross Santee
- The Kings of San Carlos (1987) by James L. Haley
- Doc Holliday's Gone: A Western Duo (2000) by Jane Candia Coleman

== Medal of Honor citation ==
Rank and organization: First Sergeant, Company B, 5th U.S. Cavalry. Place and date: Winter of 1872–73. Entered service at: —. Birth: Washington County, Md. Date of issue: April 12, 1875.

Citation:

Gallant conduct during campaigns and engagements with Apaches.

== See also ==
- List of Medal of Honor recipients
