= Fort Thomas, Arizona =

CDP in Graham County, Arizona

- Census-designated place
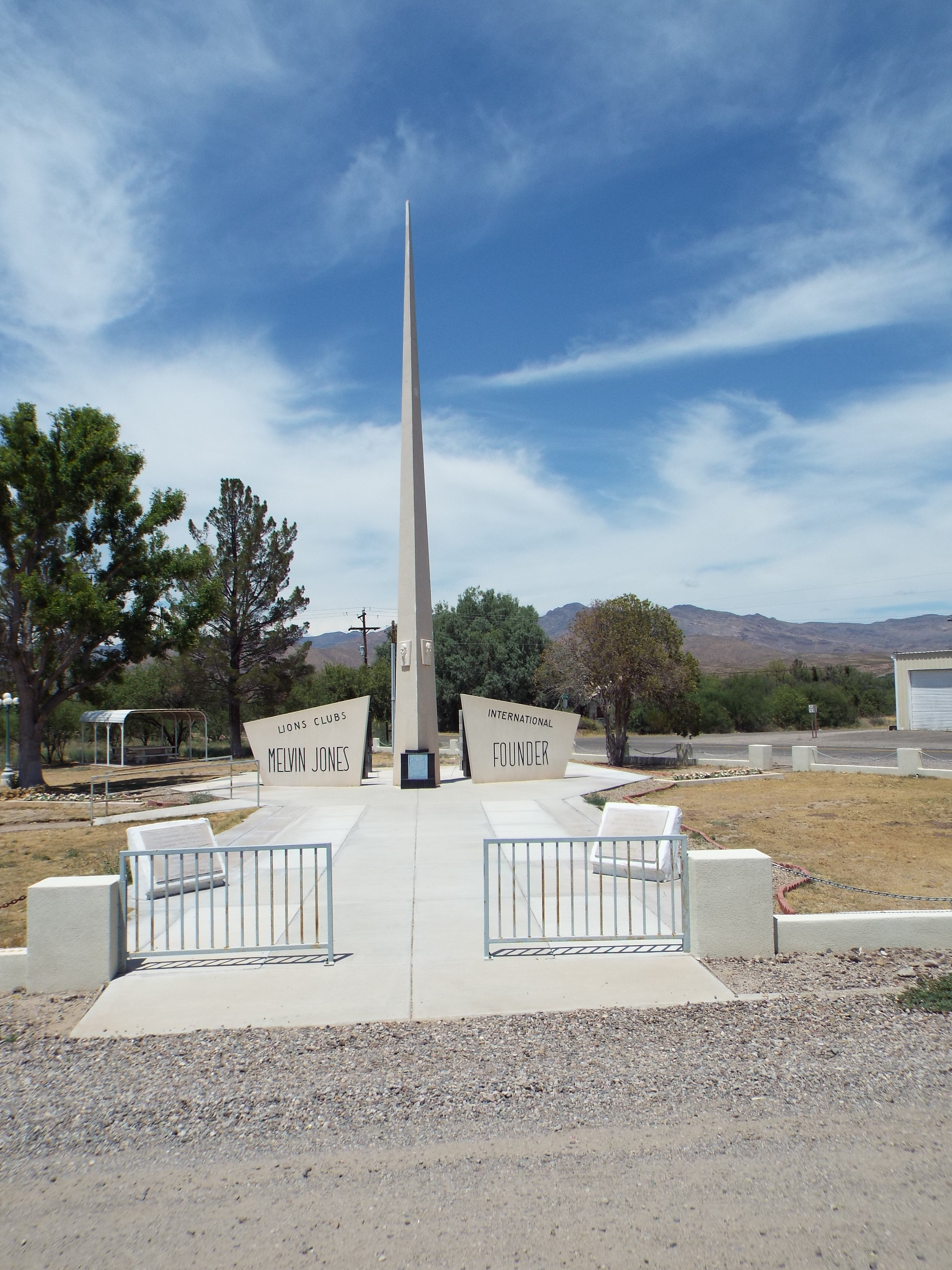
- Monument dedicated to local native Melvin Jones, founder of Lions Club International.

- Location of Fort Thomas in Graham County, Arizona.

- Location within Arizona Location within the United States
- Coordinates: 33°01′05″N 109°59′00″W
- Country: United States
- State: Arizona
- County: Graham

Area
  - Total: 8.67 sq mi (22.46 km^{2})
  - Land: 8.67 sq mi (22.46 km^{2})
  - Water: 0.0039 sq mi (0.01 km^{2})
- Elevation: 2,763 ft (842 m)

Population (2020)
  - Total: 319
  - Density: 36.8/sq mi (14.21/km^{2})
- Time zone: UTC−7 (Mountain (MST))
- ZIP code: 85536
- Area code: 928
- GNIS feature ID: 2582785

Fort Thomas (Western Apache: Gowąh Golgai Gohoshé) is a census-designated place in Graham County, Arizona, United States. Its population was 319 as of the 2020 census. The community has an elementary school and a high school. It is part of the Safford Micropolitan Statistical Area. Fort Thomas has a ZIP code of 85536.

== History ==
The earliest military presence in the area was former Camp Goodwin, constructed in 1864 and named for Arizona's first territorial governor, John N. Goodwin. The camp was abandoned after a short time due to failed buildings and malaria from a nearby spring. In 1876, the current site of the community was chosen as a "new post on the Gila," selected to replace Camp Goodwin during the Apache Wars. Initially, the site was named Camp Thomas in honor of Civil War Major General George Henry Thomas. Until 1882 the area would be known by several names including Clantonville, Camp Thomas, Maxey and finally Fort Thomas.

At its peak, the fort consisted of 27 buildings, all constructed by the occupants of the fort and made of adobe. Malaria remained a problem throughout the occupation of the area, and led to Fort Thomas being called the "worst fort in the Army." The fort also had no government funding until the year 1884. After the capture of Geronimo in 1886, the Army gradually removed the troops stationed there until the fort was handed over to the Department of the Interior in 1891.

The early town had a poor reputation, and was home to several houses of prostitution and saloons. Camp Thomas was to be the destination of the pay wagons involved in the Wham Paymaster robbery of 1889. In 1895, the community grew significantly when the Southern Pacific railroad's construction in the area was halted due to native Apache people refusing to let the railroad continue construction through their reservation. During this time, Fort Thomas also hosted a Wells Fargo station.

== Education ==
Fort Thomas has its own unified school district, the Fort Thomas Unified School District that serves the community of Fort Thomas, as well as students from nearby Bylas. The school district operates the Fort Thomas Elementary School and the Fort Thomas High School.

== Demographics ==
Historical population
Census	Pop.	Note	%±
2020	319		—
U.S. Decennial Census

== Geography ==
=== Climate ===
Fort Thomas has a borderline semi-arid climate (Köppen BSh/BSk) bordering upon an arid climate (BWh/BWk) characterised by very hot summers and winters with mild days and cold nights. Although frosts are frequent during the winter, occurring on an average of 60.2 nights during December, January and February, snow is exceptionally rare with a median of zero and a mean of 0.2 inches (0.005 m). Daily temperatures are comfortable during winter – only 5.6 days do not top 50 °F or 10 °C – but heat up rapidly as summer approaches, with half of all days by May topping 90 °F or 32.2 °C and 35.5 days topping 100 °F or 37.8 °C during an average entire year.

Rainfall is rare, with monsoonal storms much less frequent than higher up or further south. Easily the wettest month since records began in 1966 has been January 1993 when 5.27 inches or 133.9 millimetres fell – the only other totals above 4.00 inches (101.6 mm) over a single month being 4.40 inches or 111.8 millimetres in October 1983 and 4.22 inches or 107.2 millimetres in October 2000. The wettest calendar year has been 1978 with 16.50 inches or 419.1 millimetres and the driest 1989 with 3.93 inches (99.8 mm).

Climate data for Fort Thomas, Arizona, 1991–2020 normals, extremes 1966–2022
Month	Jan	Feb	Mar	Apr	May	Jun	Jul	Aug	Sep	Oct	Nov	Dec	Year
Record high °F (°C)	81 (27)	85 (29)	93 (34)	100 (38)	107 (42)	114 (46)	114 (46)	111 (44)	107 (42)	100 (38)	93 (34)	80 (27)	114 (46)
Mean maximum °F (°C)	71.2 (21.8)	77.0 (25.0)	85.1 (29.5)	91.8 (33.2)	100.1 (37.8)	106.6 (41.4)	107.1 (41.7)	104.3 (40.2)	101.0 (38.3)	93.6 (34.2)	82.2 (27.9)	70.7 (21.5)	108.5 (42.5)
Mean daily maximum °F (°C)	61.3 (16.3)	66.3 (19.1)	74.4 (23.6)	82.2 (27.9)	90.5 (32.5)	100.0 (37.8)	100.0 (37.8)	97.6 (36.4)	93.4 (34.1)	84.0 (28.9)	70.9 (21.6)	60.3 (15.7)	81.7 (27.6)
Daily mean °F (°C)	44.7 (7.1)	48.9 (9.4)	55.5 (13.1)	62.9 (17.2)	71.5 (21.9)	81.2 (27.3)	85.3 (29.6)	83.2 (28.4)	77.6 (25.3)	65.8 (18.8)	53.0 (11.7)	44.1 (6.7)	64.5 (18.1)
Mean daily minimum °F (°C)	28.1 (−2.2)	31.6 (−0.2)	36.6 (2.6)	43.6 (6.4)	52.5 (11.4)	62.4 (16.9)	70.6 (21.4)	68.8 (20.4)	61.7 (16.5)	47.6 (8.7)	35.1 (1.7)	27.9 (−2.3)	47.2 (8.4)
Mean minimum °F (°C)	17.8 (−7.9)	21.4 (−5.9)	25.7 (−3.5)	31.6 (−0.2)	40.0 (4.4)	50.4 (10.2)	61.5 (16.4)	60.9 (16.1)	50.0 (10.0)	33.4 (0.8)	20.8 (−6.2)	16.5 (−8.6)	13.4 (−10.3)
Record low °F (°C)	3 (−16)	3 (−16)	11 (−12)	23 (−5)	29 (−2)	40 (4)	42 (6)	50 (10)	39 (4)	19 (−7)	7 (−14)	8 (−13)	3 (−16)
Average precipitation inches (mm)	1.01 (26)	0.98 (25)	0.60 (15)	0.25 (6.4)	0.37 (9.4)	0.15 (3.8)	1.74 (44)	1.85 (47)	1.10 (28)	0.73 (19)	0.50 (13)	0.92 (23)	10.20 (259)
Average precipitation days (≥ 0.01 inch)	4.4	4.0	2.8	1.6	1.5	1.2	6.5	7.0	4.2	2.8	2.9	4.2	43.1
Source: NOAA

== Pictorial Chronology ==
Historical Depictions of Fort Thomas during late 19th Century

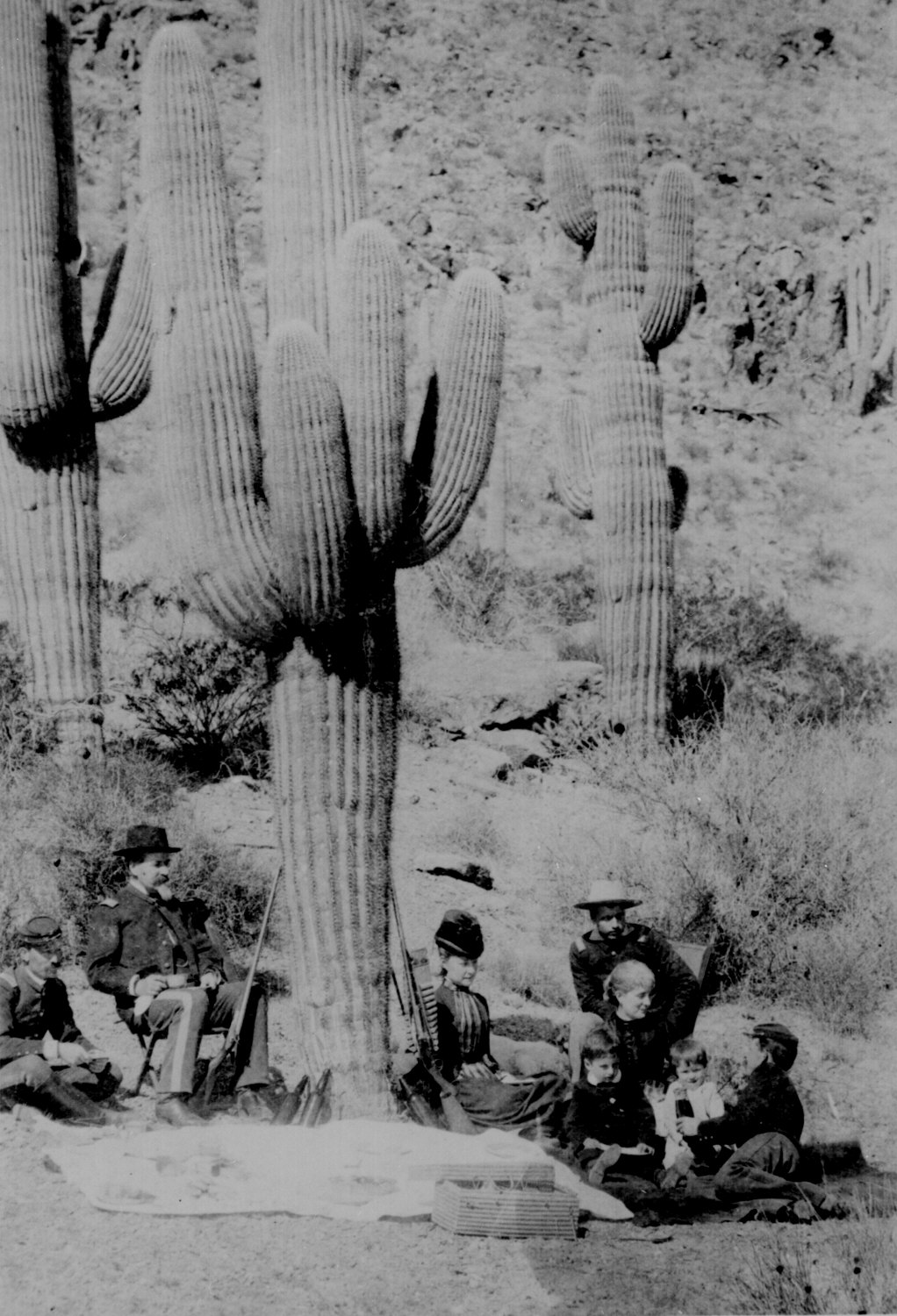
Officers and their families having a picnic at Fort Thomas on February 18, 1886

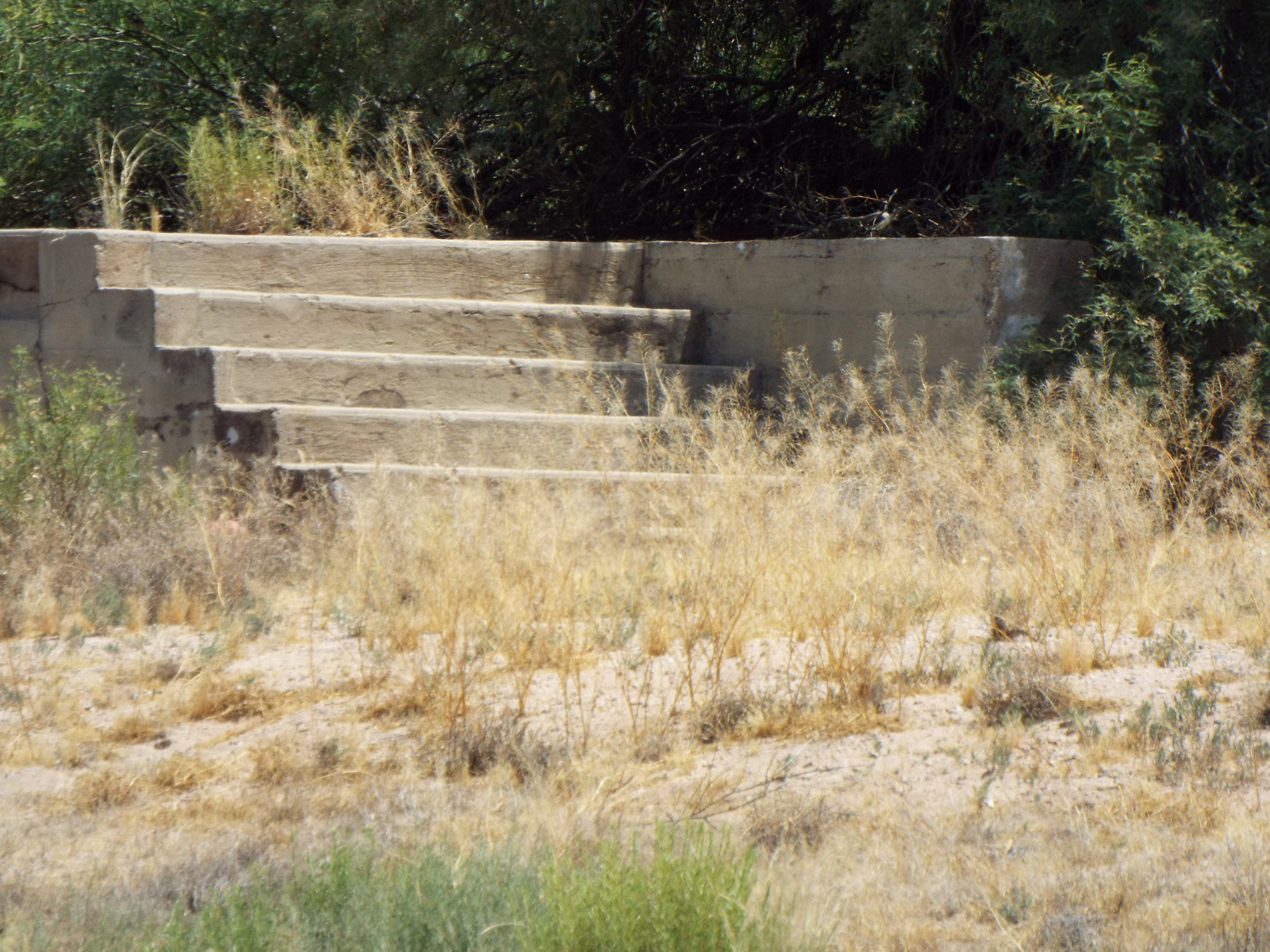
Ruins of the Southern Pacific Railroad Depot

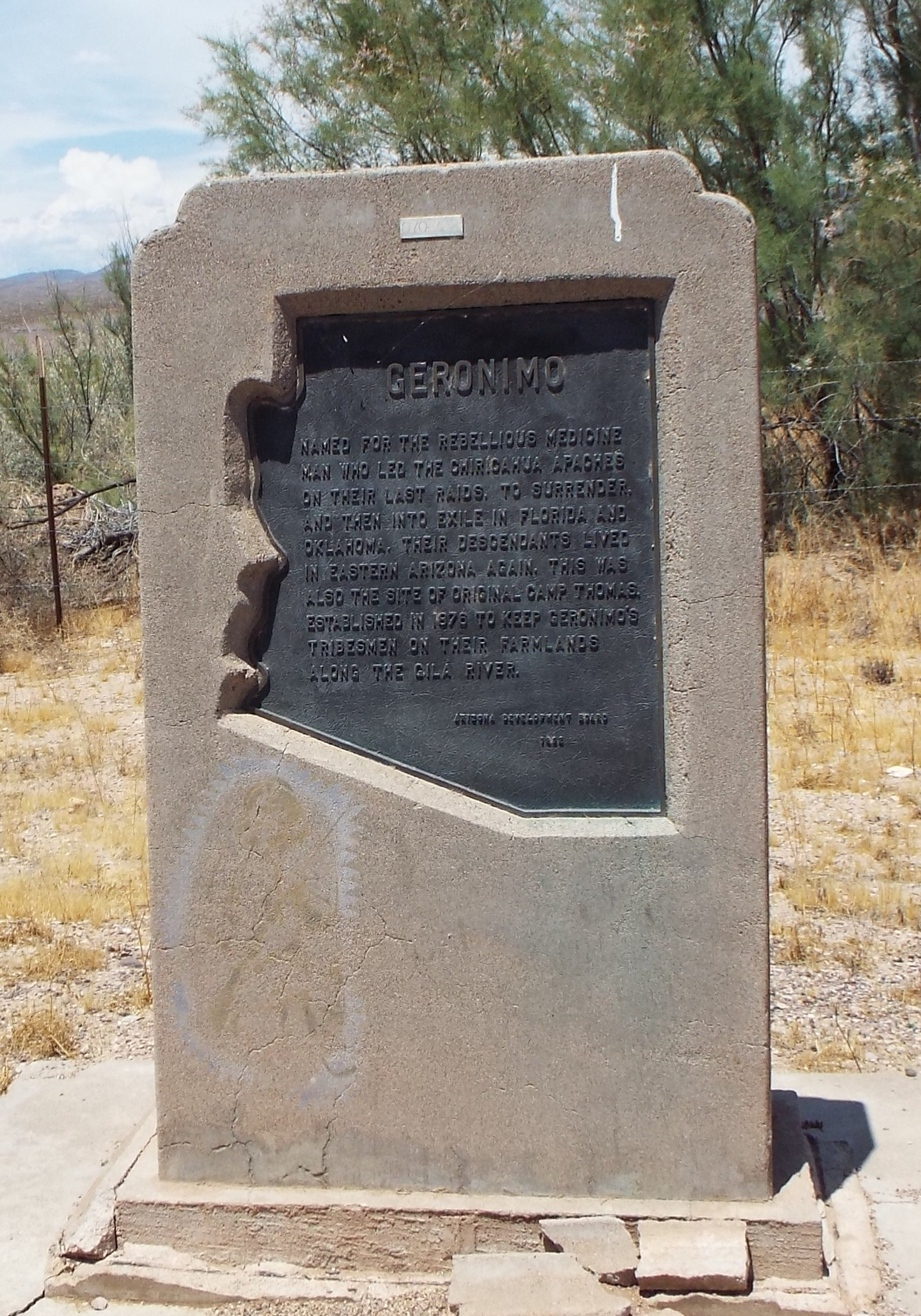
Arizona historical marker illustrative of Camp Thomas and captivity of Chiricahua Apache

== Notable person ==
- Melvin Jones – Founder of Lions Clubs International
