= San Carlos Apache Police Department =

Tribal police agency

- Common name: San Carlos Police
- Abbreviation: SCAPD

Jurisdictional structure
- Operations jurisdiction: San Carlos, Arizona, USA
- Map of San Carlos Apache Police Department's jurisdiction
- Area: 2,910.7 square miles (7,539 km^{2})
- Population: 9,385
- General nature: Local civilian police

Operational structure
- Headquarters: 200 West Pinal
- Agency executive: Elliot Sneezy, Chief of Police

Facilities
- Substations: 3

The San Carlos Apache Police Department is the tribal police agency responsible for law enforcement within the jurisdiction of the San Carlos Apache Indian Reservation. The agency is responsible for about 10,000 persons.

== Substations ==
- San Carlos
- Bylas
- Apache Gold Casino

== Line of duty deaths ==
According to ODMP, 5 officers of the SCAPD have been killed in the line of duty.

== See also ==
- List of law enforcement agencies in Arizona
