= John Wood Mansion =

Historic house in Illinois, United States

- U.S. National Register of Historic Places
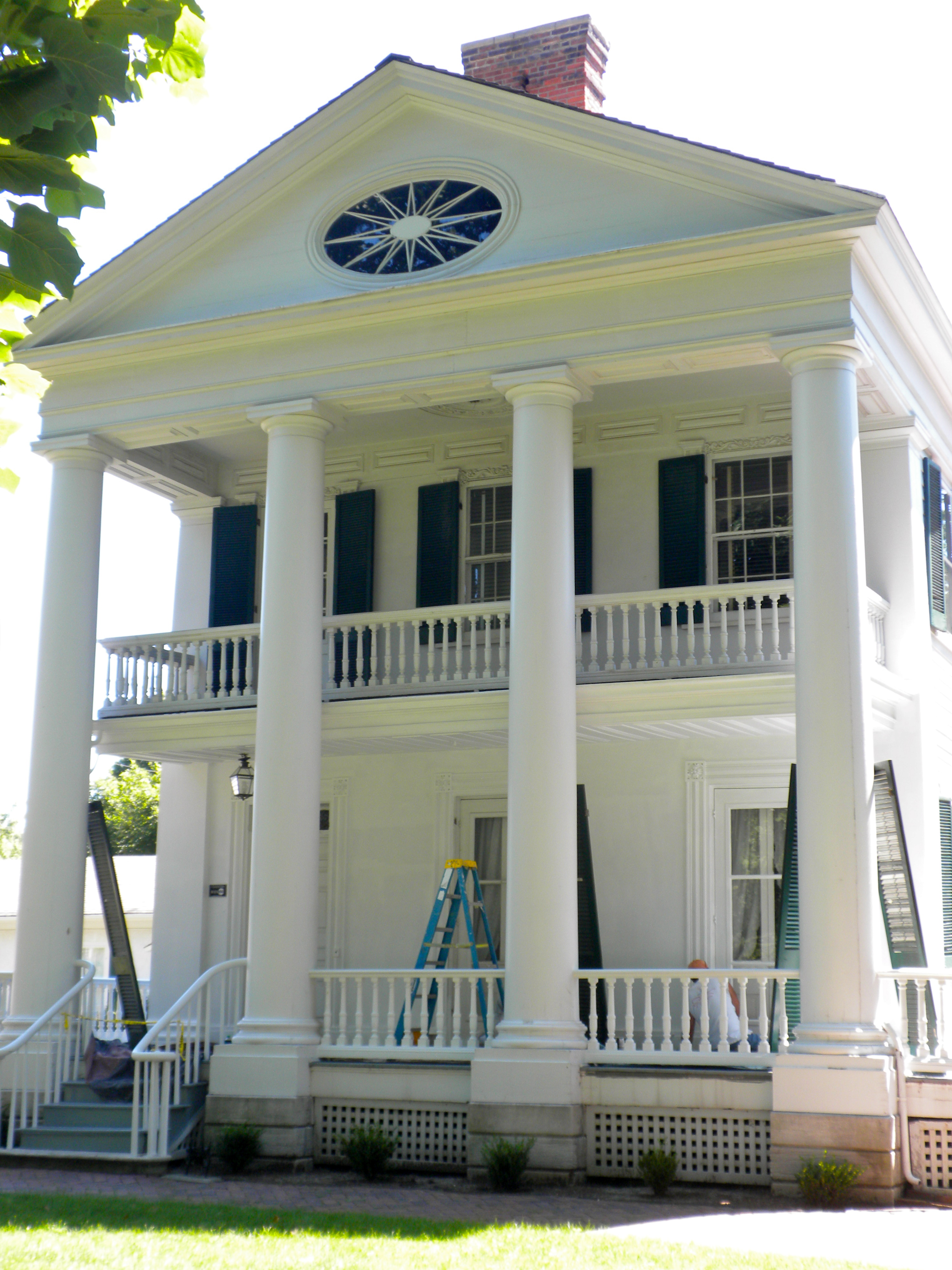

- Location within Illinois Location within the United States
- Interactive map showing the location of John Wood Mansion
- Location: [425 S. 12th St., Quincy, Illinois
- Coordinates: 39°55′36″N 91°23′45″W
- Built: 1835
- Architectural style: Greek Revival
- NRHP reference No.: 70000228
- Added to NRHP: April 17, 1970

The John Wood Mansion was built between 1835 and 1838 by John Wood, who in 1860 became the 12th governor of Illinois on the death of Governor William Bissell. The Wood family moved into the Greek Revival home situated at 12th and State Streets in Quincy, Illinois from an unusual two-story log cabin in 1837. Quincy is the county seat of Adams County. Wood founded both the county (1825) and city (1835).

Wood's 14-room mansion was built by John Cleaveland and endured a move from its original site to its current location, about a block east, so Wood could build an even larger mansion. The Greek Revival building was added to the National Register of Historic Places on April 17, 1970, and in 2007 was named by the Association of Independent Architects one of Illinois' 150 most important architectural structures. The John Wood Mansion features four large Doric columns, which Wood himself turned at a lathe he built for that purpose, four large chimneys and many ornate details inside and out. A great many original Wood family and period furnishings are displayed throughout the mansion. Today it is owned and operated by the Historical Society of Quincy and Adams County.

The house is open for public tours from April through October. The Society also offers educational tours of the house to all local 3rd and 4th grade students each year, as well as special candlelight tours open to the public in December.

In celebration of the 2018 Illinois Bicentennial, the John Wood Mansion was selected as one of the Illinois 200 Great Places by the American Institute of Architects Illinois component (AIA Illinois).

== See also ==
- Chaddock College
