= Bylas, Arizona =

CDP in Graham County, Arizona

- Census-designated place
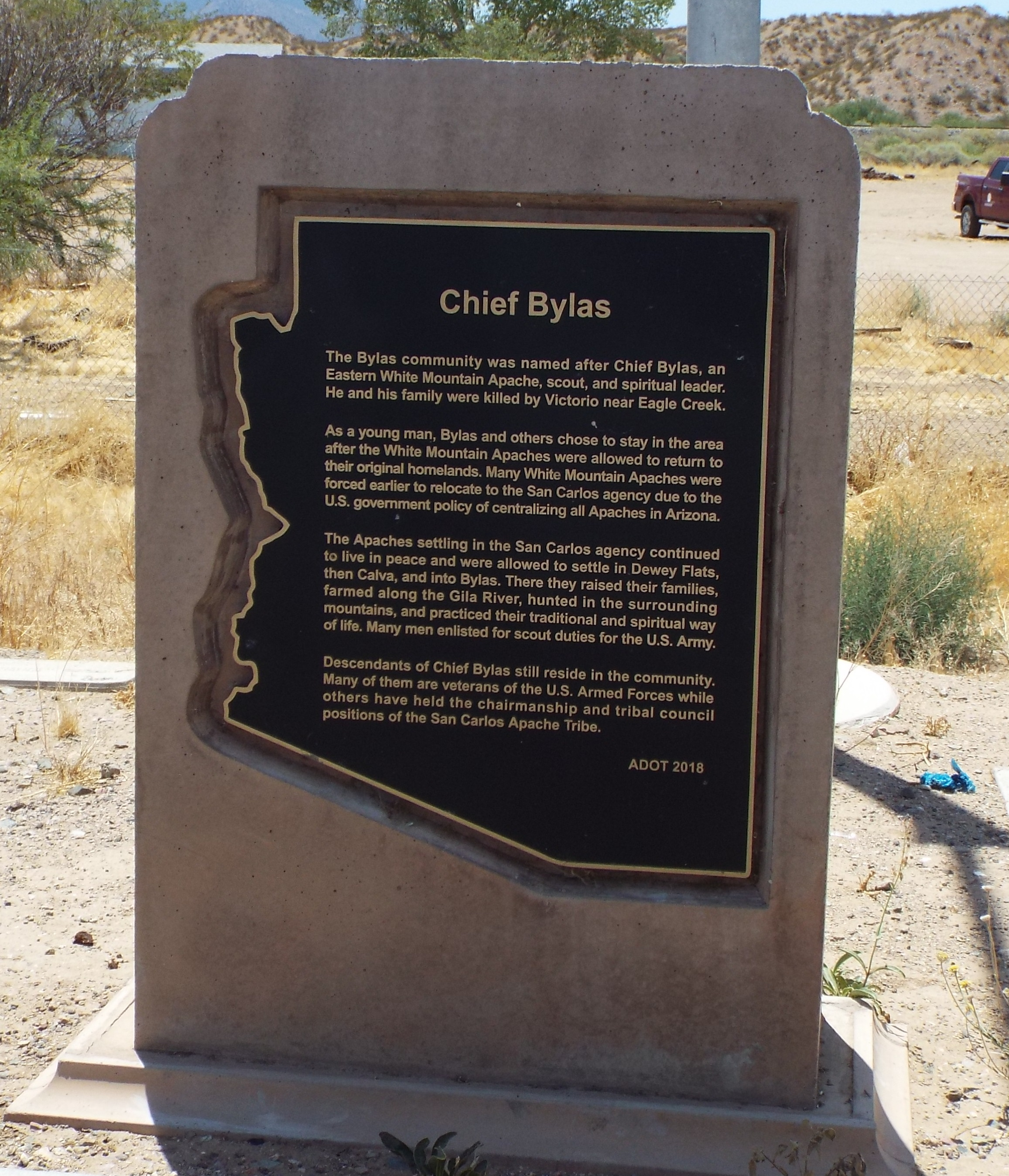
- Historic Bylas Town marker

- Location of Bylas in Graham County, Arizona.

- Location within Arizona Location within the United States
- Coordinates: 33°07′45″N 110°07′00″W
- Country: United States
- State: Arizona
- County: Graham
- Indian Reservation: San Carlos Apache Indian Reservation

Area
  - Total: 4.20 sq mi (10.88 km^{2})
  - Land: 4.18 sq mi (10.83 km^{2})
  - Water: 0.019 sq mi (0.05 km^{2})
- Elevation: 2,622 ft (799 m)

Population (2020)
  - Total: 1,782
  - Density: 426.2/sq mi (164.55/km^{2})
- Time zone: UTC-7 (Mountain (MST))
- ZIP code: 85530
- Area code: 928
- FIPS code: 04-08710
- GNIS feature ID: 2582743

Bylas (Western Apache: Hago'teełe) is an unincorporated community and census-designated place in Graham County, Arizona, United States, located within the San Carlos Apache Indian Reservation. As of the 2010 census, its population was 1,962. The community has a medical clinic, a police substation, and a market. Bylas is an Apache settlement divided into two communities, one of the White Mountain Apache, the other of San Carlos and Southern Tonto Apache. It is named for Bylas (a.k.a. Bailish) a chief of the Eastern White Mountain Apache band.

== Demographics ==
Historical population
Census	Pop.	Note	%±
1960	500		—
1970	1,125		125.0%
1980	1,175		4.4%
1990	1,219		3.7%
2000	1,147		−5.9%
2010	1,962		71.1%
2020	1,782		−9.2%
U.S. Decennial Census

Bylas' population in 1960 was estimated as 500.

Bylas appeared on the 1970 U.S. Census as an unincorporated village. In 1980, it was made a census-designated place (CDP).

=== 2020 census ===
As of the 2020 census, Bylas had a population of 1,782. The median age was 28.9 years. 34.3% of residents were under the age of 18 and 8.5% of residents were 65 years of age or older. For every 100 females there were 97.6 males, and for every 100 females age 18 and over there were 92.9 males age 18 and over.

0.0% of residents lived in urban areas, while 100.0% lived in rural areas.

There were 424 households in Bylas, of which 57.1% had children under the age of 18 living in them. Of all households, 34.2% were married-couple households, 24.5% were households with a male householder and no spouse or partner present, and 33.3% were households with a female householder and no spouse or partner present. About 13.3% of all households were made up of individuals and 3.6% had someone living alone who was 65 years of age or older.

There were 454 housing units, of which 6.6% were vacant. The homeowner vacancy rate was 0.0% and the rental vacancy rate was 0.0%.

Racial composition as of the 2020 census
Race	Number	Percent
White	10	0.6%
Black or African American	2	0.1%
American Indian and Alaska Native	1,765	99.0%
Asian	0	0.0%
Native Hawaiian and Other Pacific Islander	0	0.0%
Some other race	0	0.0%
Two or more races	5	0.3%
Hispanic or Latino (of any race)	18	1.0%

=== 2010 census ===
It appeared normally again as a CDP on the 2010 returns.

=== 2000 census ===
In 2000, it did not initially appear on the census returns, but the census viewer page later returned a population of 1,147.

== Transportation ==
The road is served by U.S. Route 70.

San Carlos Apache Nnee Bich'o Nii Transit provides transportation on the reservation and to Safford and Globe. Greyhound Lines serves Bylas on its Phoenix-El Paso via Globe route.

== Education ==
Bylas is served by the Fort Thomas Unified School District.

== Notable person ==
- Chesley Goseyun Wilson, Apache fiddle maker and player, National Heritage Award winner (1989)

== Climate ==
According to the Köppen Climate Classification system, Bylas has a semi-arid climate, abbreviated "BSk" on climate maps.

== See also ==
- Safford micropolitan area
