= Sophie Naylor Grubb =

American activist (1834-1902)

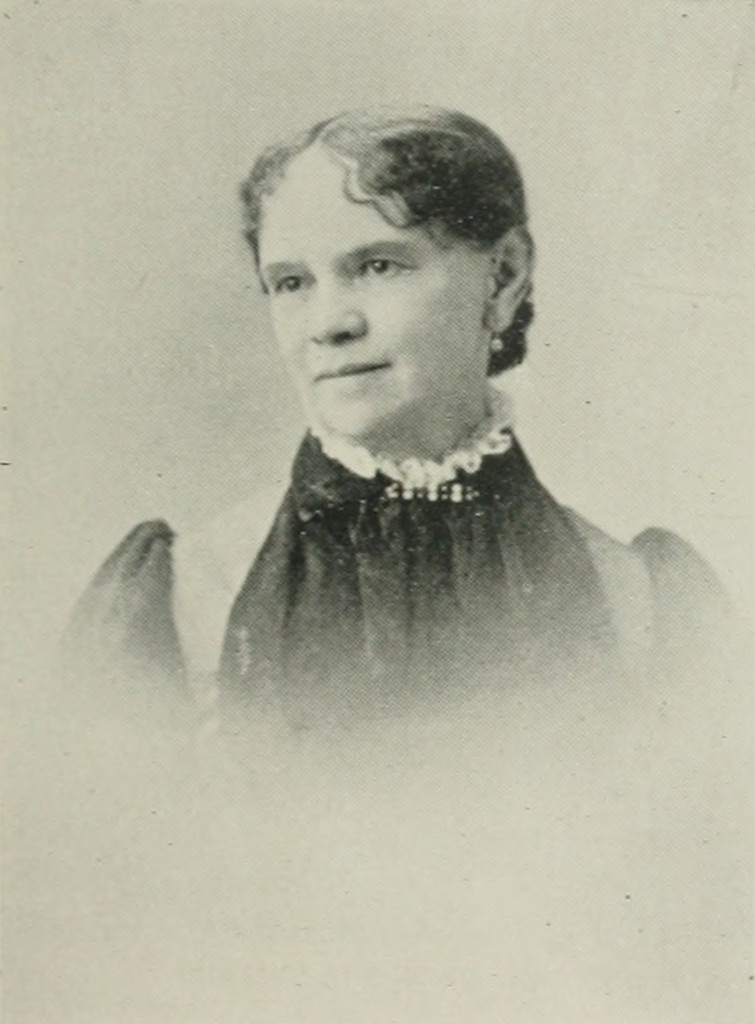
- Photo in A Woman of the Century
- Born: Sophronia Farrington Naylor; November 28, 1834; Woodsfield, Ohio, U.S.
- Died: November 5, 1902 (aged 67); Chanute, Kansas, U.S.
- Occupations: activist; writer
- Spouse: Armstead Otey Grubb (m. 1856)
- Children: 5
- Writing career
- Language: English
- Genres: leaflets; tracts
- Subject: temperance

Sophie Naylor Grubb (née, Naylor; November 28, 1834 – November 5, 1902) was a 19th-century American activist. During the civil war, she began to manifest the ability, energy and enthusiasm for activism that distinguished her through life. She published leaflets and tracts on all the issues of the temperance movement in seventeen languages, at the rate of fifty editions of 10,000 each per year. She lectured on the issue of women's suffrage, holding 75 meetings in Kansas in 1898.

== Early life and education ==
Sophronia (nicknames, "Sophie" and "Sophia") Farrington Naylor was born in Woodsfield, Ohio, November 28, 1834.

Her educational training was directly under the care of her father. When seventeen years old, she was graduated in Classics from the Illinois Conference Female College (now known as MacMurray College), in Jacksonville, Illinois in the late 1850s.

== Career ==
At the age of nineteen, she was put in charge of the woman's department of Chaddock College, Quincy, Illinois. In 1856, in Missouri, she married Armstead Otey Grubb, of St. Louis. They had five children including Sophia and Edith. Until 1861, she was engrossed in matters of the home.

At the beginning of the Civil War, she and her family returned to Quincy. During the emergencies of wartime, she began to manifest the ability, energy and enthusiasm that distinguished her through life. Devoted to her country, for four years and without compensation, she gave her attention to helping in hospital, camp and field locations. At times, she helped bring up the sick and wounded from southern swamps and fields. Surgeons and nurses being scarce, she was one of the women who had nerve to assist during surgical operations. Meanwhile, the needs of the African Americans were forced on her attention. Many of them, as refugees, went to her husband's office, asking assistance, and were sent by him on to his home, with directions that their wants were to be supplied. The work became so heavy a drain on time, strength and sympathy, that Mrs. Grubb called a public meeting, and with her sister, Mrs. Shields, and with others, organized a Freedmen's Aid Society. In the three years following, they cared and provided for over 3,000 destitute African Americans.

At the close of the war, the Grubbs returned to St. Louis. When her sons grew to manhood, the dangers surrounding them growing out of the liquor traffic led Grubb to develop a deep interest in the struggle of the home against the saloon, gradually concentrating upon it. In 1882, she was elected national superintendent of the work among foreigners, one of the most onerous of the forty departments of the national organization of the Woman's Christian Temperance Union (WCTU). By her effort and interest, she brought that department up to be thoroughly organized, wide-reaching and flourishing. She published leaflets and tracts on all the phases —economic, moral, social and evangelistic— of the temperance movement in seventeen languages, at the rate of fifty editions of 10,000 each per year. These were distributed all over the United States. She established a missionary department in Castle Garden, New York City, through which instructions in the duties and obligations of American citizenship were afforded to immigrants in their own languages as they landed. After making her home in Lawrence, she served as president of the Kansas WCTU.

In 1898, she spoke about how during the preceding twelve months, she held over 100 meetings in Kansas, 75 of which were lectures bearing upon the subject of suffrage in various ways. As National Superintendent of "work among foreigners" of the WCTU, the free bestowal of the ballot upon aliens and the denial of the same privilege to our American-born women received a great deal of attention in these lectures.

== Death and legacy ==
She died at Chanute, Kansas, November 5, 1902.

In April 1903, it was reported that the Kansas branch of the WCTU was erecting a Frances E. Willard Memorial building in Florest park, Ottawa, Kansas, with a column and tablet to be placed therein in memory of Mrs. Sophia Naylor Grubb.
