= Barbara May =

American Apache politician and social worker

San Carlos Apache Tribal Council for the Gilson Wash district
- Incumbent
- Assumed office November 2020

Personal details
- Citizenship: San Carlos Apache Indian Reservation; United States
- Education: American Indian Bible College

Barbara May is an Apache politician and social worker serving as a member of the San Carlos Apache Tribal Council for the Gilson Wash district since November 2020. Her career in public service has primarily focused on social services, with over 30 years of experience in the field.

== Life ==
May graduated from the American Indian Bible College with an associate of arts (AA) degree in social work. May worked in social services for thirty years. Her work spanned Tribal Child Protective Services, case management, investigations, and eligibility management.

Elected to the San Carlos Apache Tribal Council to represent the Gilson Wash district in November 2020, May has focused on key priorities such as housing, infrastructure, and economic development. She has also worked to improve social services in the district, with the goal of promoting a healthier community. May serves on several boards, commissions, and committees, including the Recreation and Wildlife Commission, Judicial and Law Enforcement, Education, Finance, Natural Resources, Health and Welfare, and Tribal Livestock.

== See also ==
- List of Native American politicians
- Native American women in politics
