= Ina Salter =

San Carlos Apache Tribal Council for the Seven Mile district
- Incumbent
- Assumed office 2022

Personal details
- Citizenship: San Carlos Apache Indian Reservation; United States
- Education: Grand Canyon University

Ina Salter is an Apache politician and educator serving as a member of the San Carlos Apache Tribal Council for the Seven Mile district since 2022. She was previously the executive assistant to tribal chairman Terry Rambler.

== Life ==
Salter returned to formal education after a ten-year period as a stay-at-home mother. At the age of thirty, she earned her General Educational Development (GED), marking a significant personal achievement. She earned a bachelor's degree in educational studies and a master's degree in communication with an emphasis on education in 2022, both from Grand Canyon University. She was elected as a member of the Alpha Chi. Salter is working toward a doctor of education degree in organizational leadership.

Salter worked in education for 19 years, during which she held multiple roles, including volunteer, teacher aide, literacy program coordinator, and principal. As principal, she led a school through a re-accreditation process, aligned its curriculum to state standards, and introduced professional learning communities (PLC) to improve student outcomes. Salter actively lobbied for school funding and worked with off-reservation donors to secure contributions through Arizona tax credit donations.

Salter served as an executive assistant to San Carlos Apache Tribe chairman Terry Rambler. She completed two terms as an AmeriCorps volunteer, working under the Save the Children organization. During the 2022 general election, Salter was elected a member of the San Carlos Apache Tribal Council for the Seven Mile district. She won the election with 42.73 percent of the vote, defeating Duane Ian Goode and Jolene G. Hoffman.

== See also ==
- List of Native American politicians
- Native American women in politics
