= Valerie Key-Cheney =

Apache politician

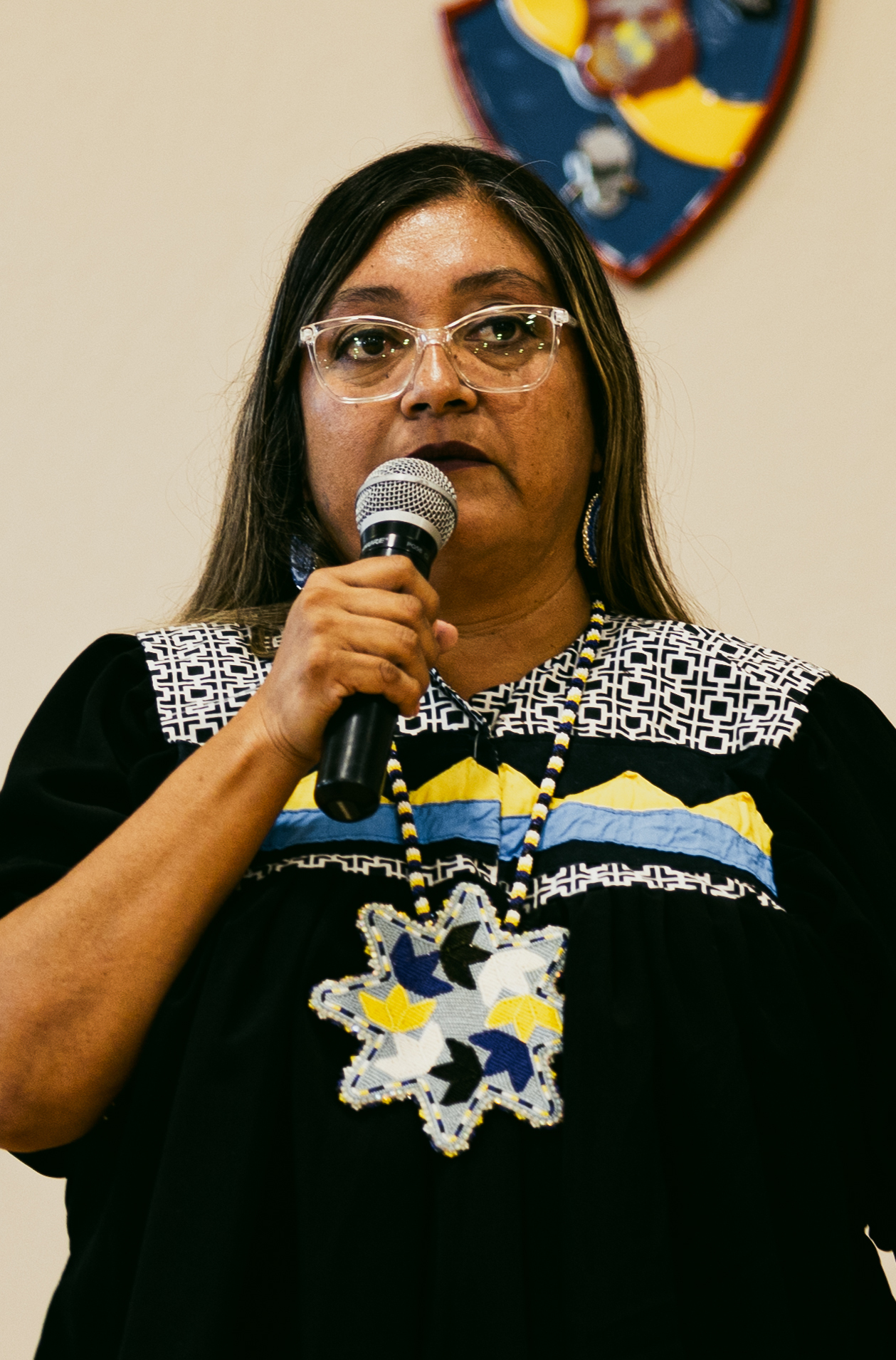
- Key-Cheney in 2022

San Carlos Apache Tribal Council for the Peridot district
- Incumbent
- Assumed office November 2018

Personal details
- Citizenship: San Carlos Apache Indian Reservation; United States

Valerie Key-Cheney is an Apache politician serving as a member of the San Carlos Apache Tribal Council for the Peridot district since 2018.

== Career ==
Key-Cheney was a special projects manager with the San Carlos Apache Tribe Office of the General Manager, where she was involved in managing various tribal initiatives. She is the rodeo coordinator for the San Carlos Apache Tribe's Annual Fair and Rodeo Commission.

Key-Cheney was elected a member of the San Carlos Apache Tribal Council for the Peridot district in November 2018. She has focused on addressing issues related to health, safety, and the overall well-being of tribal members. Key-Cheney serves on several boards and committees including Health and Welfare, Water and Waste Water Treatment, Employee Benefits, Judicial and Law Enforcement, Human Resources, Natural Resources, Transportation, and Water (BRPS). During the 2022 general election, she secured a second term with 57.45% of the vote, defeating candidates Ross Nelson Dia, Steve Duane, and Dee Randall, who garnered 20.81%, 4.72%, and 17.02% of the vote, respectively.

== See also ==
- List of Native American politicians
- Native American women in politics
