= Evalena Henry =

Apache basketweaver

Evalena Henry (born February 5, 1939) is a San Carlos Apache basket weaver and teacher from Arizona. In 2001, she was awarded a National Endowment of the Arts fellowship for her craftsmanship.

== Biography ==
=== Early life ===
Evalena Henry was born a member of the San Carlos Apache in Peridot, Arizona. The daughter of Robert and Cecilia Henry, she first learned her tribe's basket weaving traditions from her mother, Cecilia Henry, a master of the craft. Cecilia Henry began making baskets in the 1950s, to prevent the traditions of the tribe from dying out. Cecilia Henry taught her basketry skills to her daughters, Celina, Viola, Joann and Evalena, who would all become noted weavers.

Evalena Henry first attended Rice School, on the San Carlos Reservation, later attending the Globe School in Globe, Arizona. As a girl, she worked hard to learn how to split willow to make baskets, the skill did not come naturally to her.

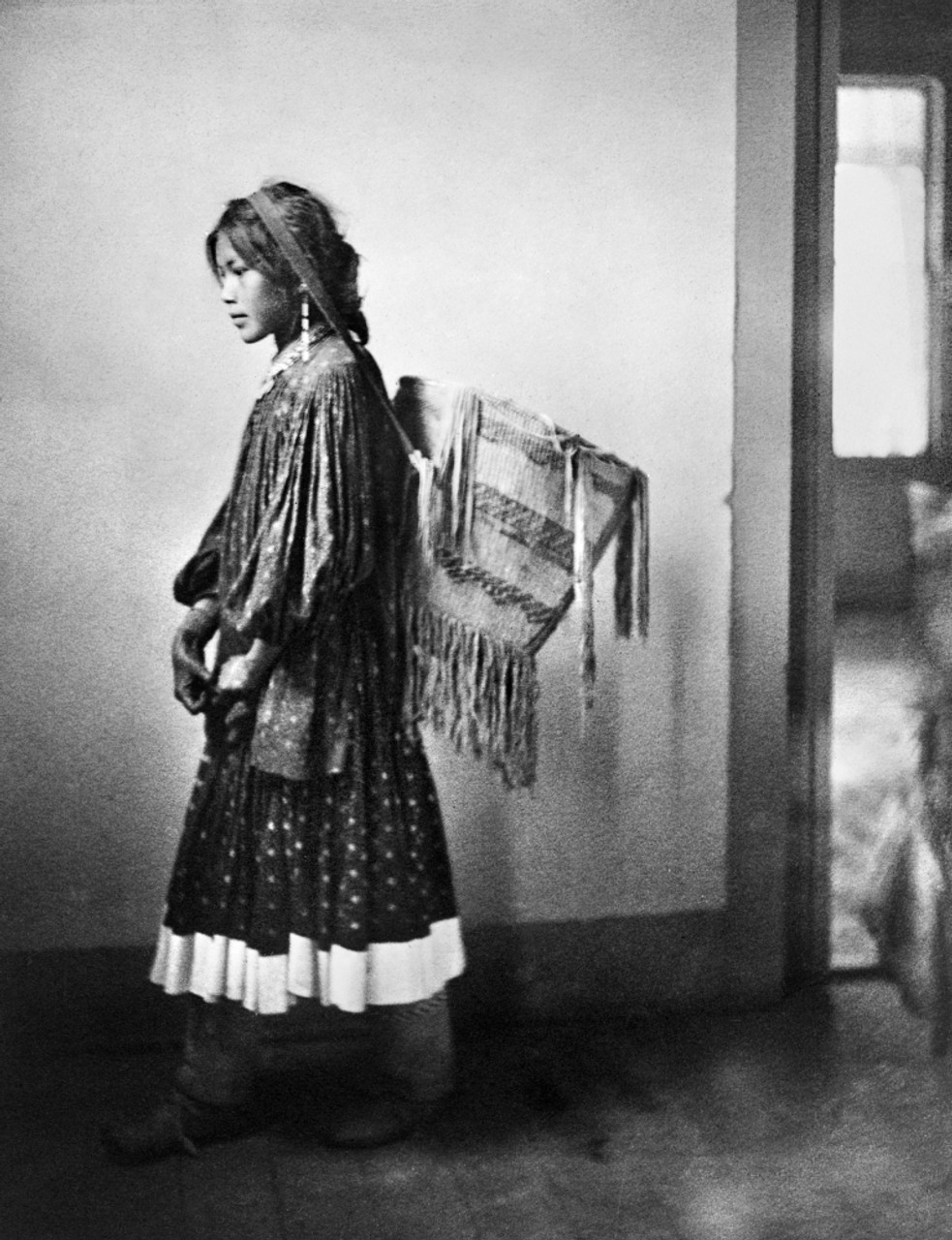
Historical example of the Sunrise burden basket that Henry specializes in

=== Sunrise baskets ===
In the 1970s, Evalena began making traditional baskets for the Apache's Sunrise Dance ceremony, a traditional coming of age rite for girls in the tribe. Evalena became known for her intricate designs for these ceremonial burden baskets, many of which utilize her mother's unique weave patterns.

Henry uses different colored willow and cottonwood branches from the forests found in Arizona's White Mountain Reservation for her basketry. She uses the different colored fibers to create unique motifs on her baskets, including cactuses, horses, deer and crown dancers. Henry is also known for making tus baskets, baskets that are used to traditionally carry water. Henry uses pinon pitch to ensure her baskets are watertight.

=== Recognition ===
Henry has taught basketry at the Taos Art Institute and at the Camp Verde reservation to ensure that her skills are not lost. In 2001, she was named a fellow by the National Endowment of the Arts. For her fellowship in Washington, DC, she would take her first trip by airplane.

In 2005, she received an Eric and Barbara Dobkin Fellowship from the School for Advanced Research.

In 2006, she returned to Washington to demonstrate her basket weaving skills at the Smithsonian Folklife festival.
