= Melvin Jones (Lions Club) =

Founder of Lions Clubs International

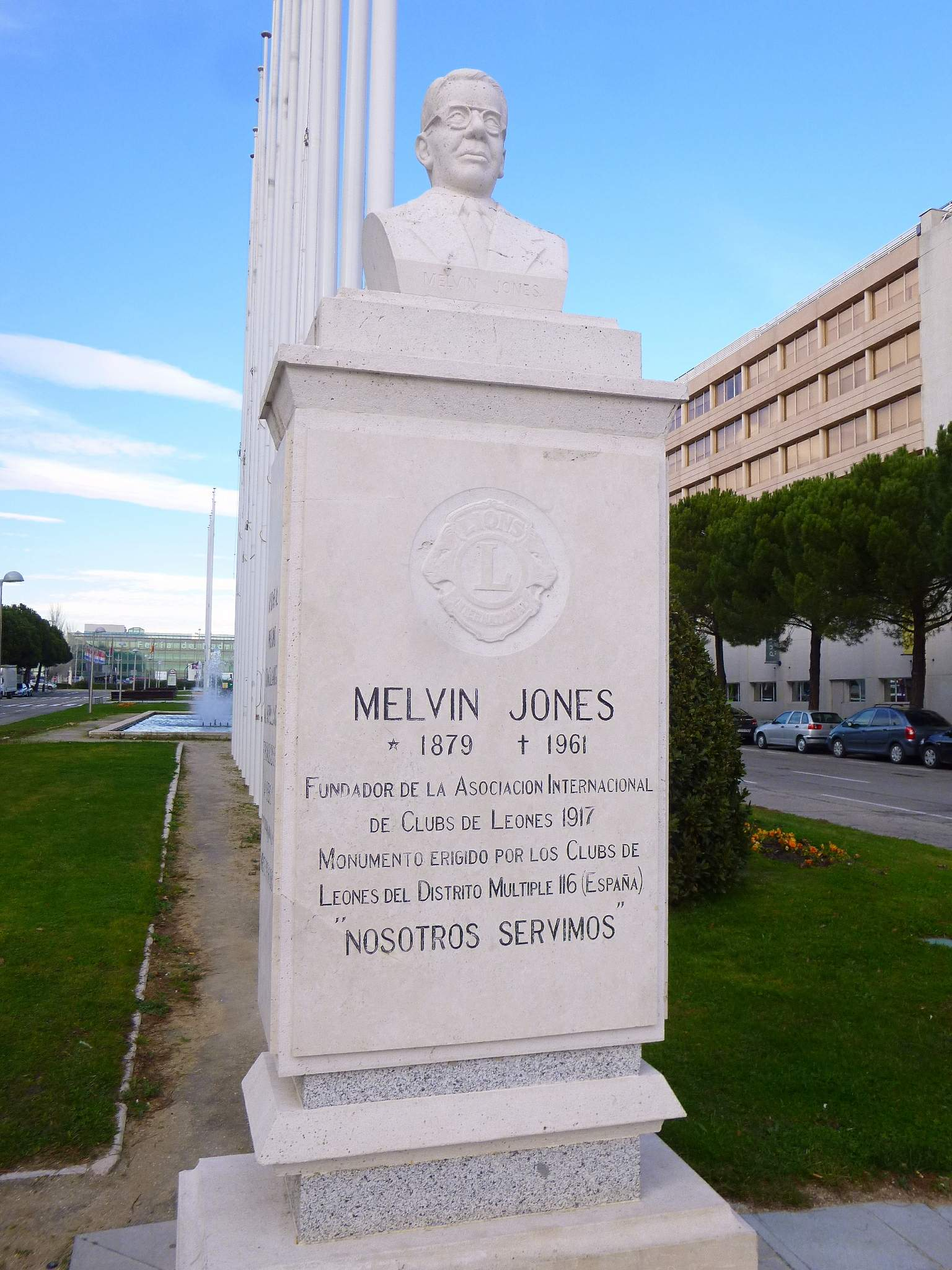
Monument to Melvin Jones in Madrid, Spain

Melvin Jones (January 13, 1879 – June 1, 1961) was the founder and secretary-treasurer of Lions Clubs International.

== Biography ==
He was born on January 13, 1879, in Fort Thomas, Arizona (at that time the Arizona Territory). His father was a captain in the United States Army. In 1886 or 1887, the family moved east when his father was transferred. Melvin Jones settled in Chicago, where he studied at the Union Business and Chaddock colleges of Quincy, Illinois. At age 33 he was the sole owner of his own insurance agency in Chicago and became a member of the local business circle, and was elected secretary shortly thereafter. Melvin Jones was also a Freemason, initiated in 1906 at Garden City Lodge No. 141 in Chicago, Illinois.

After two years, prompted by his personal code – "You can't get very far until you start doing something for somebody else" – Jones proposed that the talents of the circle's members could be better utilized in other areas of community life, He invited representative from other men's clubs in and around Chicago to a meeting to devise a suitable organization and from that meeting, Jones subsequently integrated his club into an existing initiative that further led to his selection as Secretary of the "International Association of Lions Clubs" later to be named "Lions Clubs International". Jones eventually gave up his insurance agency to work full-time at Lions International Headquarters.

In 1945, Jones represented Lions Clubs International as a consultant at the United Nations Conference on International Organization in San Francisco.

== Memorials ==
A statue of Jones stands in front of the Lions Clubs International headquarters in Oak Brook, Illinois.

There is a memorial to Melvin Jones, in the form of a fifty-foot spire, in his birthplace of Fort Thomas.

There is a Melvin Jones Memorial Grandstand in Burnham Park, Philippines.
