= Chesley Goseyun Wilson =

Native American artist, singer, dancer and actor (1932–2021)

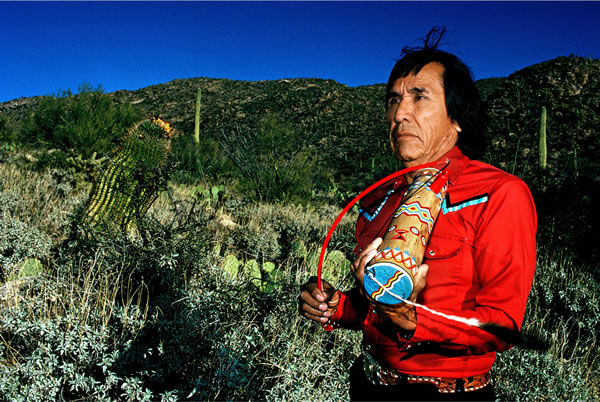
- Wilson in 1989

Background information
- Born: July 31, 1932; Bylas, San Carlos Apache Indian Reservation, Arizona, U.S.
- Died: October 4, 2021 (aged 89) Safford, Arizona, U.S.
- Occupations: Musician, singer, dancer, medicine man, silversmith, actor
- Instruments: Apache fiddle, vocals
- Labels: Eagle Clan, Smithsonian Folkways, EMI Music Canada

Chesley Goseyun Wilson (July 31, 1932 – October 4, 2021) was a maker and performer of the Apache fiddle, singer, dancer, medicine man, silversmith, former model, and actor. Wilson received a National Heritage Fellowship from the National Endowment for the Arts in 1989.

== Early life ==
Chesley Goseyun Wilson was born on July 31, 1932, in the town of Bylas on the San Carlos Apache Indian Reservation in Arizona. His father, Nichol Wilson, was a medicine man and a rancher. His mother, Sarah Goseyun Wilson, died when Chesley was only two years old. Wilson is a descendant of Cochise, Eskiminzin, Santo and other noted Apache leaders. Because his father's work often required him to be on remote parts of the reservation, the pre-teen Wilson was raised by his grandfather and uncles, who were prominent musicians, singers, religious and medicine leaders of the Apache people. He learned about the making of the Apache violin and Apache flute from his uncle, Albert Goseyun. Wilson is the last active Apache violin maker descended from noted Apache musician Amos Gustina. As a teenager, he returned to the home of his father where he learned the skills of a horseman, first as a wrangler and later as a cowboy in roundups.

== Career ==
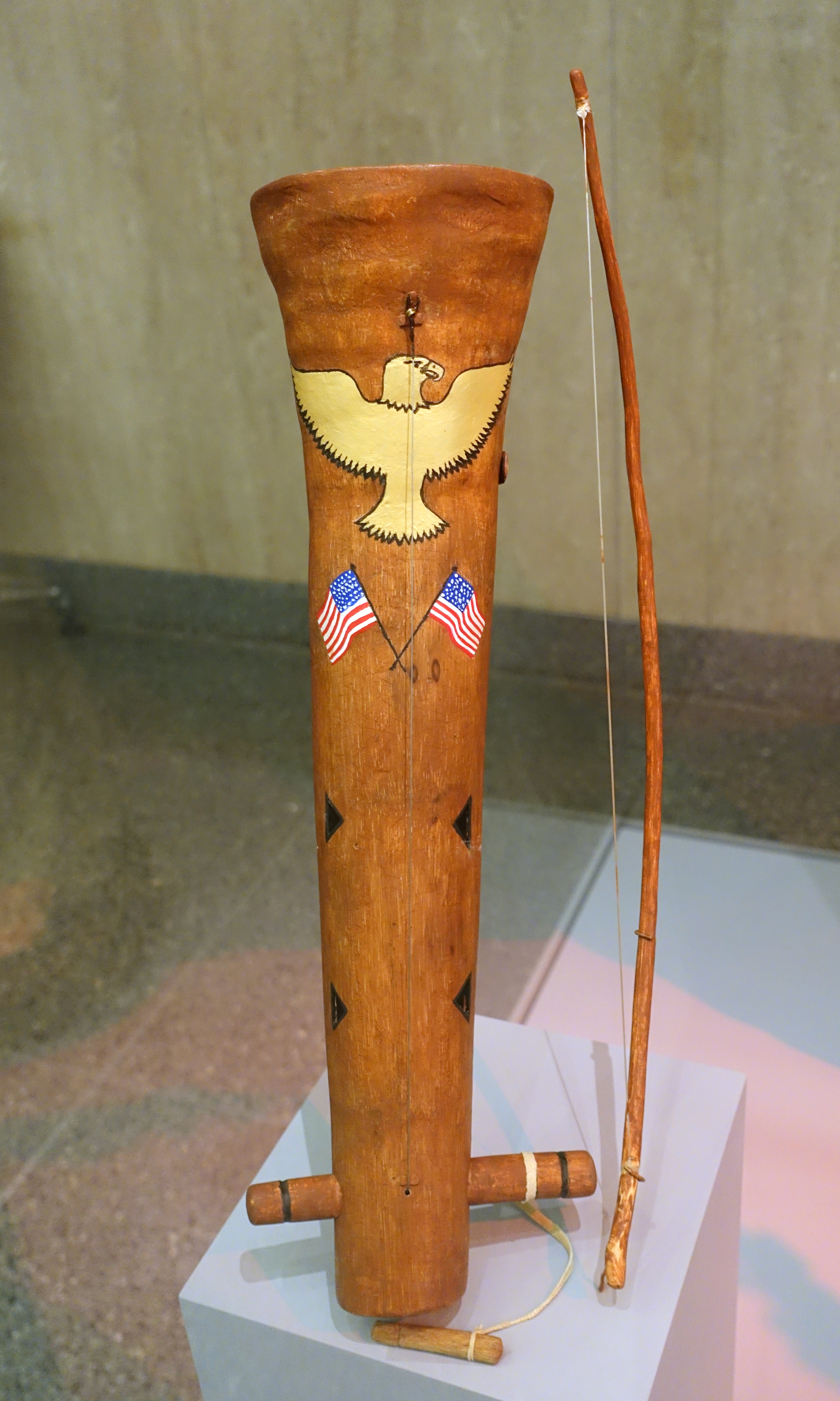
Apache fiddle made by Chesley Goseyun Wilson (San Carlos Apache) in the National Museum of American History, 1989

In 1953, he was drafted by the US Army and served a two-year tour of duty in Korea, which exposed the young man to many experiences never possible when growing up on the reservation. After his discharge in 1955, he participated in a US government program for Native Americans where he trained as a silversmith and then worked for over twenty years in the San Francisco region and in Carson City, Nevada. He returned to Arizona in 1982.

While working as a silversmith and occasionally as a security guard, Wilson continued to make Apache violins in his free time, as well as striving "to keep other Apache crafts, customs, and ceremonies alive" which garnered his 1989 National Heritage Fellowship, the United States government's highest honor in the folk and traditional arts. One of his art pieces is in the musical instruments collection in the Smithsonian Institution in Washington, D.C. He also made a traditional Apache violin for the Governor's Art Awards in March 1991. In 1992, Wilson was named an Arizona Indian Living Treasure.

Wilson was a model for several years, working with Western artists Howard Terpning, Logan Maxwell Hagege and photographer Ray Manley. His photograph was on the cover of the July 1995 issue of Southwest Art magazine. He was also a model for the Wrangler Western Wear clothing line.

He worked as an actor over the years, appearing in both credited and uncredited roles portraying Native Americans.

Wilson was an active member of the Apache Medicine Men Society, and often spoke to Apache youth about avoiding alcohol and drugs, encouraging them to incorporate traditional Apache ways into their lives.

== Films ==
=== Actor ===
- Geronimo (1993 TV movie)
- Buffalo Soldiers (1997 TV movie)
- South of Heaven, West of Hell (2000 film)
- Skinwalkers (2002 TV movie)
- Rio de Oro (2010 film)
- 12 Years a Slave (2013 film)
- The Revenant (2015 film)
- Apache Leap (2022 film)

=== Soundtrack ===
- 12 Years a Slave (performer)
- The Revenant (songwriter and performer)

== Publications ==
- When the Earth Was Like New: Western Apache Songs & Stories (book with CD, 1994)

== Discography ==
- Apache Eagle Dream (Eagle Clan Music)
- The Singing Winds (Eagle Clan Music)
- Wood That Sings: Indian Fiddle Music Of The Americas (Smithsonian Folkways CD SF 40472, 1997), contributing performer
- The Soundtrack Of A People: A Companion To The Encyclopedia Of Native Music (EMI Music Canada, 2005), contributing performer
