= Chaddock College =

College in Quincy, Illinois, US

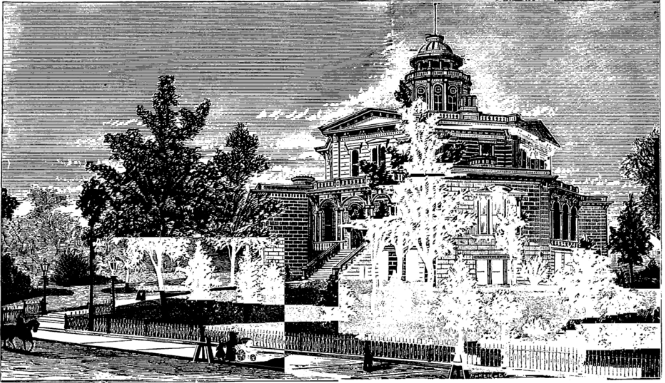
Chaddock College

Chaddock College (previously, German and English Methodist Academy and Johnson College; became Chaddock Boys’ School in 1899) was located in Quincy, Illinois. Initially known as the German and English Methodist Academy, the school was renamed Johnson College for a short time before it was organized and chartered as Chaddock College in 1878. In 1899, it was reorganized again as Chaddock Boys’ School.

== Background ==
The Quincy circuit of the Methodist Episcopal Church was organized in 1832. At the same time, the Quincy district was formed, of which Peter Cartwright was presiding elder, and the whole district was involved in missionary work. In 1857, Quincy had become a station, having 184 members, 145 Sunday school students, and church property valued at US$8,000. The German Methodist Church had a good congregation, and the African Methodist Episcopal Church had an organization.

== Early history ==
In 1853, a literary institution, known as the German and English Methodist Academy, was founded, and a few years afterwards, was raised to the grade of a college. A building was erected, but for some years, was laden with heavy debt. In 1874, Johnson College, of Macon, Missouri, was consolidated with Quincy College.

It was always under the direction of the Methodist Episcopal church. Professor Jacques, one of its early teachers, was president from 1860 until 1865, and in the latter year, the Rev. George W. Gray, became president, continuing at the head of the institution until 1871 or 1872, and during that time D. L. Musselman, later president of the Gem City business College, was a teacher in the institution from 1867 until 1870. Upon the retirement of President Gray, the name was changed to Johnson College, but this name was retained for only two or three years. The former location of the school was where the Jefferson public school later stood.

== John Wood Mansion ==
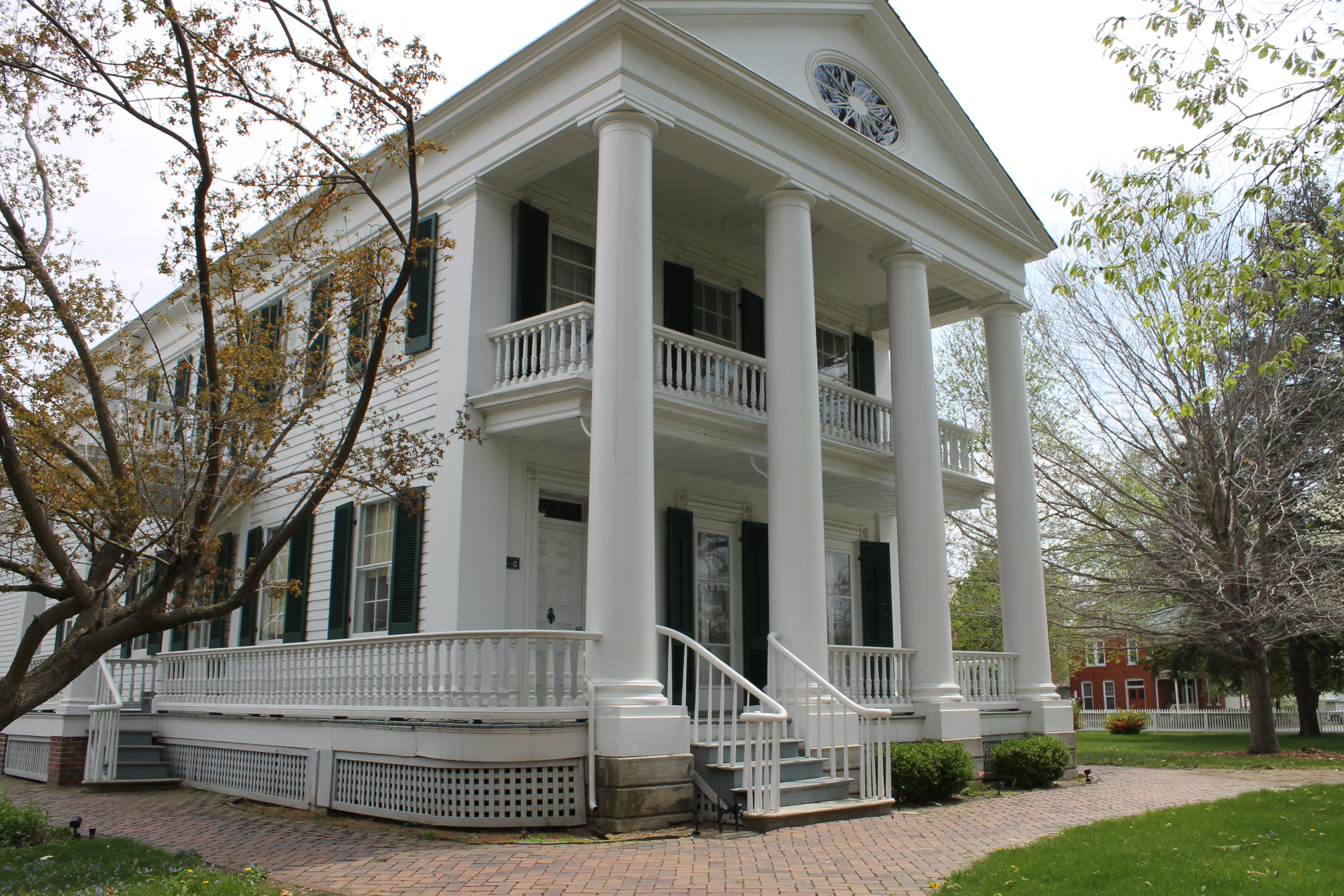
John Wood Mansion

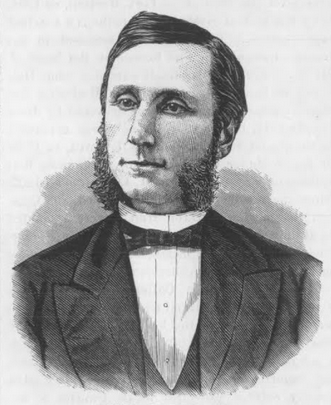
Edwin Walter Hall, president

In December 1875, when the John Wood Mansion, at the corner of Eleventh and State streets, was sold in the courts, it was purchased by the college. It had belonged to former Governor John Woods, and originally cost some US$200,000. The trustees disposed of their former college building to the city for a public school. The former location of the school was where the Jefferson public school later stood.

In December 1876, the school having become involved in debt, a donation of US$30,000 was made to the college by Charles Chaddock, of Astoria, Illinois. It was organized and chartered in 1878 as Chaddock College. It was under the care of Rev. Edwin Walter Hall, A.M., assisted by a corps of teachers, and had a regular and thorough course of study. In 1888, the Quincy College of Medicine was reorganized and became the medical department of Chaddock College.

== Chaddock Boys’ School ==
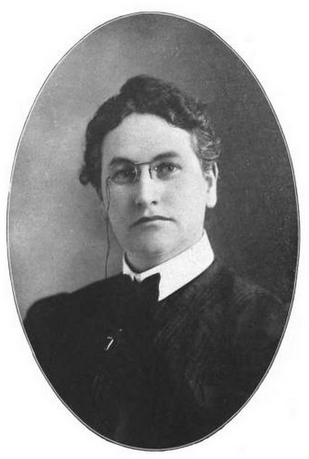
Eleanor Tobie, principal, Chaddock Boys’ School (1905)

The name Chaddock College was retained until it was changed to the Chaddock Boys’ School, in 1899. At that time it was decided to make it a school exclusively for boys, and after that, it enjoyed an era of marked prosperity and growth, having paid off its debt, so that it was free from all financial encumbrances. About 1883, H. J. Vickers, of Adams county, gave to the school a large sum of money and this was used in the erection of a large three-story brick building with basement. It had 120 by 60 feet (37 m × 18 m) and was used for a dormitory in connection with the school. Boys were admitted between the ages of six and sixteen years and could pursue academic and preparatory courses, fitting them for regular college work. The students were from sixteen different states. The school was conducted upon an economic basis and was under the direction of the Methodist church, the property being owned by the Illinois Conference. The assistant principal was Anna Johnson, who was also teacher of drawing and manual training. Fourteen other well-trained teachers constituted the faculty, with an enrollment of 125 pupils. Half of the work was free, and the funds were supplied by friends of the institution.

== Notable people ==
- Melvin Jones
- William H. Wheat
- Sophronia Farrington Naylor Grubb
- Charles E. MacMurray, alumni of college and its law school, served on its faculty, and became a state senator
