= Apache fiddle =

Bowed string instrument

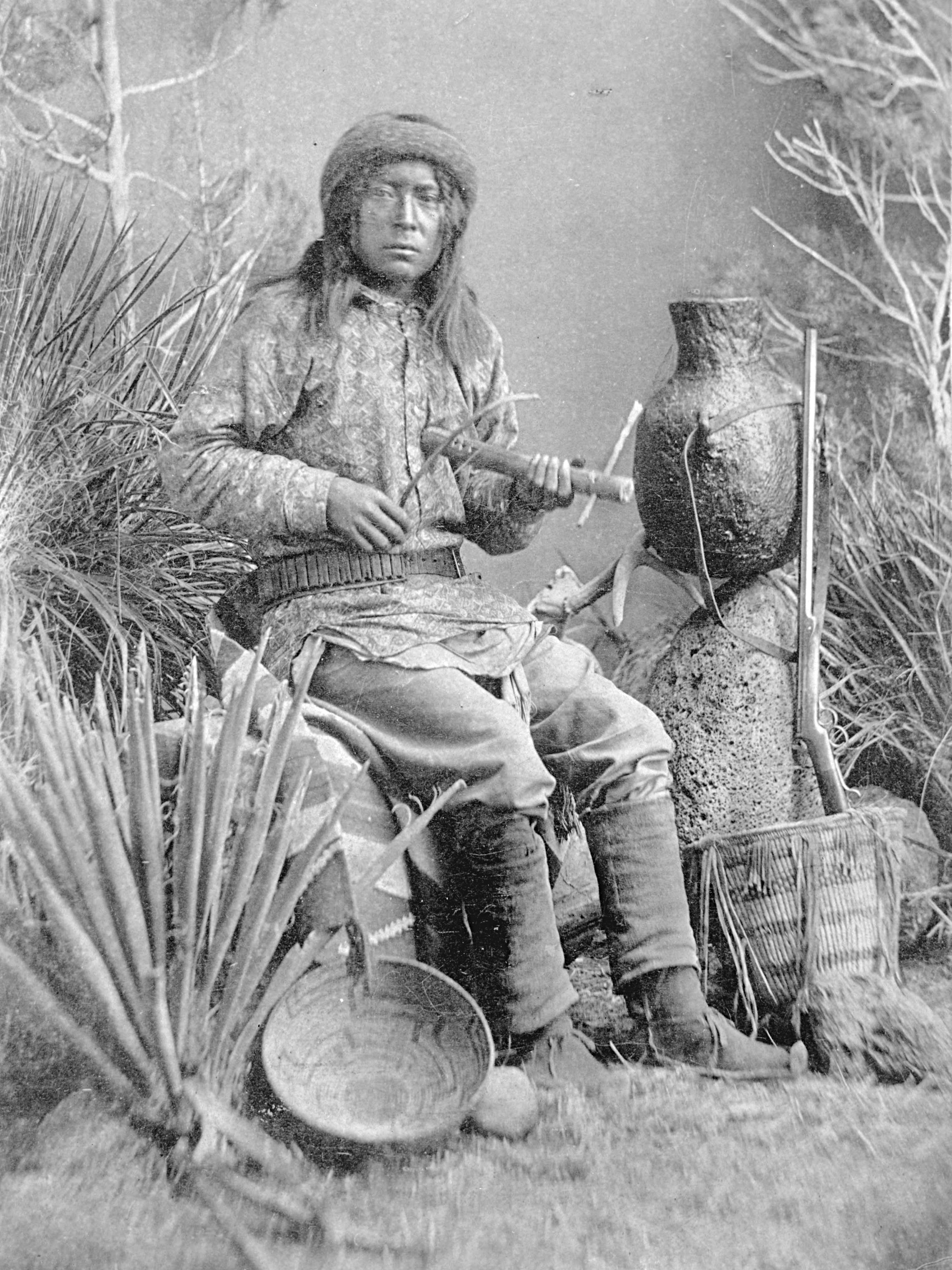
Chasi, a Warm Springs Apache musician playing the Apache fiddle, 1886, photo by A. Frank Randall

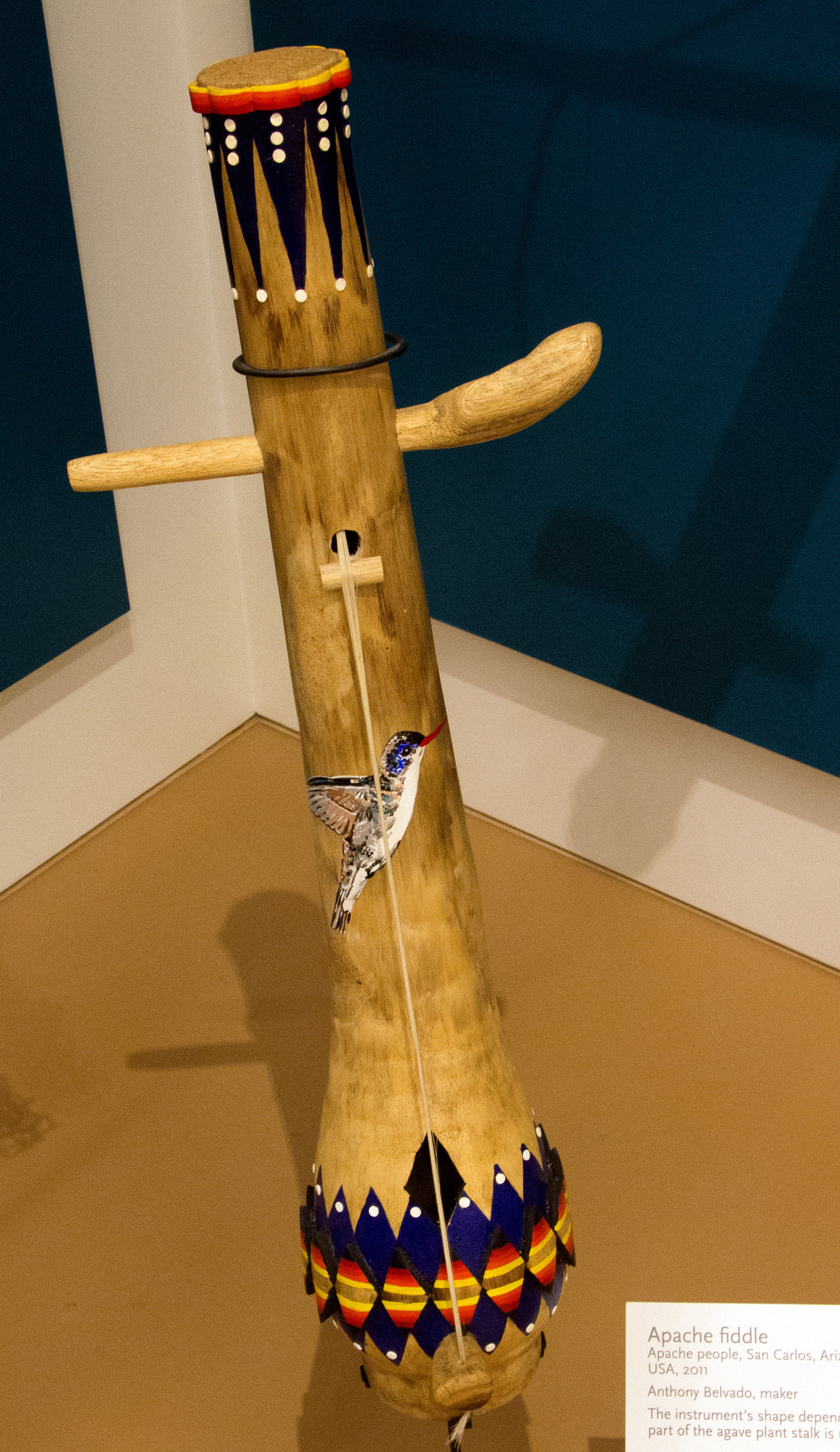
Arizona Apache fiddle, from the Musical Instrument Museum - Phoenix, Arizona

The Apache fiddle (Apache: tsii' edo'a'tl, "wood that sings") is a bowed string instrument used by the indigenous Apache people of the southwestern United States. The instrument consists of a plant stalk, such as that of the agave or mescal plant. One or sometimes two strings, often made of horse hair, are secured at both ends of the stalk, a bridge and nut added, and the string is played with a bow resined with pine pitch. The string is touched with the fingers to change its note. The Smithsonian Institution holds an Apache fiddle collected in 1875. In 1989 Apache fiddle maker Chesley Goseyun Wilson of Tucson, Arizona won a National Heritage Award.

== See also ==
- Cornstalk fiddle

== Sources ==
- Native American Stringed Musical Instruments by Daniel Brinton. in The American antiquarian and oriental journal By Stephen Denison Peet Jameson & Morse, 1897 v. 19, pg 20.
- The Apache Violin: Indigenous violin music in South and North America Jon Rose Web, 2005
