= Lions Clubs International =

International service organization based in the United States

- Lions Clubs International
- Formation: June 7, 1917
- Founder: Melvin Jones
- Type: Service club
- Headquarters: Oak Brook, Illinois, U.S.
- Members: 1,389,075
- President: A P Singh
- Website: Official website

Lions Clubs International is an international service organization, currently headquartered in Oak Brook, Illinois. As of January 2020, it had over 46,000 local clubs and more than 1.4 million members (including the youth wing Leo) in more than 200 geographic areas around the world.

== Introduction ==
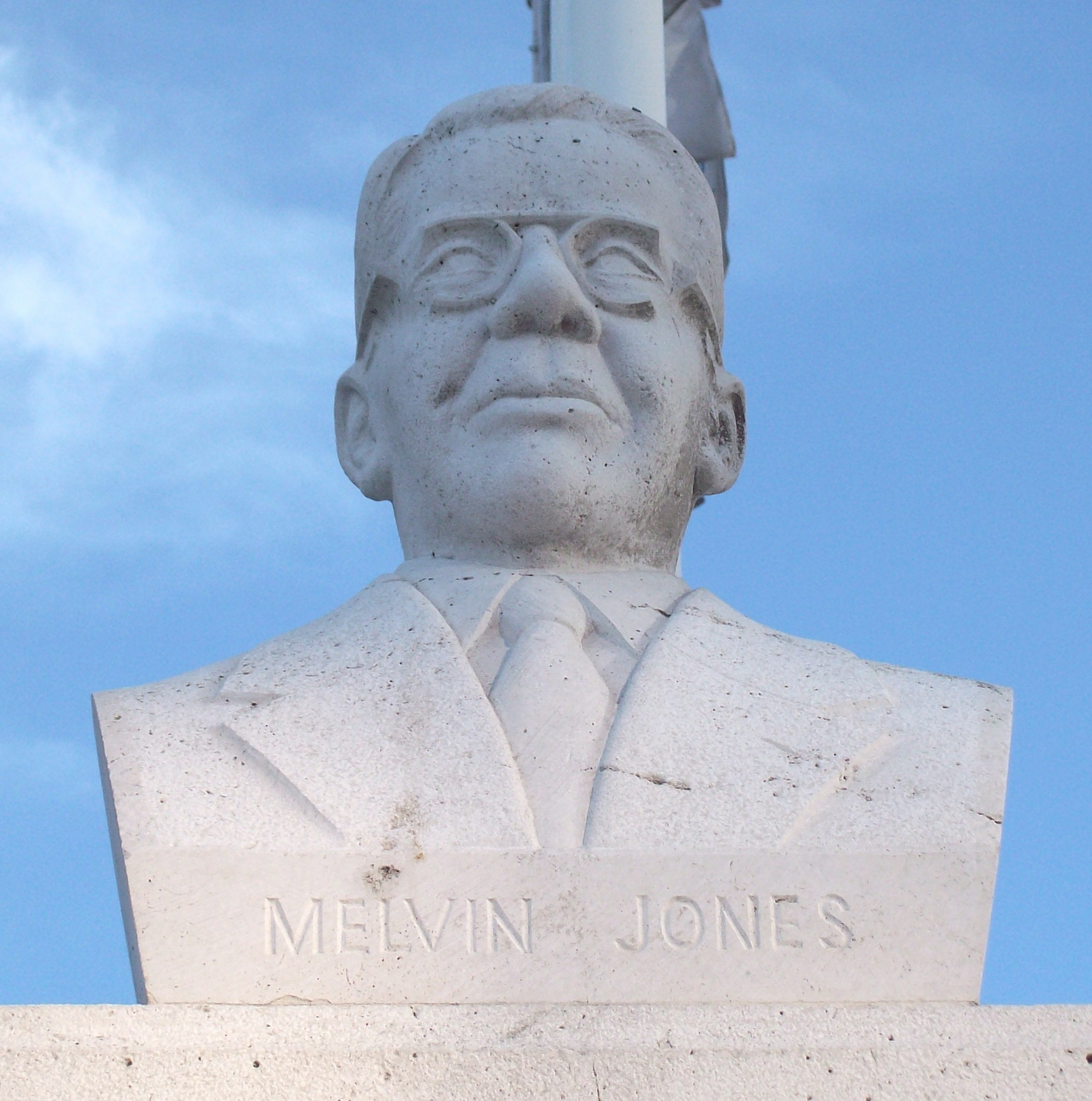
Bust of Melvin Jones, the founder of Lions Clubs International, in Madrid

The Association of Lions Clubs was established in 1917 in Chicago, Illinois, by Melvin Jones, a Chicago business leader and a Freemason. The Association went international in 1920 when Border Cities Lions Clubs in Windsor, Canada, was established. The name of Lions Clubs International has been used since then. It subsequently evolved as an international service organization under the guidance and supervision of its secretary, Melvin Jones.

In 1917, Jones was a 38-year-old Chicago business leader who told members of his local business club they should reach beyond business issues and address the betterment of their communities and the world. Jones's group, the Business Circle of Chicago, agreed. After contacting similar groups around the United States, an organizational meeting was held on June 7, 1917, in Chicago. The Business Circle subsequently joined one of the invited groups, the "International Association of Lions Clubs", and at a national convention held in Dallas, Texas, later that year, those who were assembled: (1) adopted a Constitution, By-Laws, Code of Ethics and an Emblem; (2) established as a main tenet "unselfish service to others", (3) unanimously elected William Perry Woods as its first president, effectively securing his leadership for the first two years of the existence of the International Association of Lions, and (4) selected Jones to serve as the organization's secretary-treasurer.

The Lions motto is "We Serve". Local Lions Club programs include sight conservation, hearing and speech conservation, diabetes awareness, youth outreach, international relations, environmental issues, and many other programs. The discussion of partisan politics and sectarian religion is forbidden. The LIONS acronym also stands for Liberty, Intelligence, Our Nations' Safety.

== Focus ==
=== Service projects ===
Lions Club eyeglass donation box

Lions Clubs plan and participate in a variety of service projects. Examples include donations to hospices, or community campaigns such as Message in a Bottle, a United Kingdom and Ireland initiative which places a plastic bottle with critical medical information inside the refrigerators of vulnerable people. Money is also raised for international purposes. Some of this is donated in reaction to events such as the 2004 Indian Ocean earthquake and the 2013 Typhoon Haiyan (Yolanda). Other money is used to support international campaigns, coordinated by the Lions Clubs International Foundation (LCIF), such as Sight First and Lions World Sight Day, which was launched in 1998 to draw world media attention to the plight of sight loss in the developing world.

Lions focus on work for the blind and visually impaired began when Helen Keller addressed the international convention at Cedar Point, Ohio, on 30 June 1925 and charged Lions to be Knights of the Blind.

Lions also conduct community hearing- and cancer-screening projects. In Perth, Western Australia, they have conducted hearing screening for over 30 years and provided seed funding for the Lions Ear and Hearing Institute established September 9, 2001, a center of excellence in the diagnosis, management, and research of ear and hearing disorders. In Perth, Lions have also assisted in the establishment of the Lions Eye Institute. In Brisbane, Queensland, the Lions Medical Research Foundation provides funding to a number of researchers. Ian Frazer's initial work, leading to the development of a HPV vaccine for the human papillomavirus which could lead to cervical cancer, was funded by the Lions Medical Research Foundation.

Lions Clubs International has supported the work of the United Nations since that organization's inception in 1945, when it was one of the non-governmental organizations invited to assist in the drafting of the United Nations Charter in San Francisco, California.

=== International foundation ===
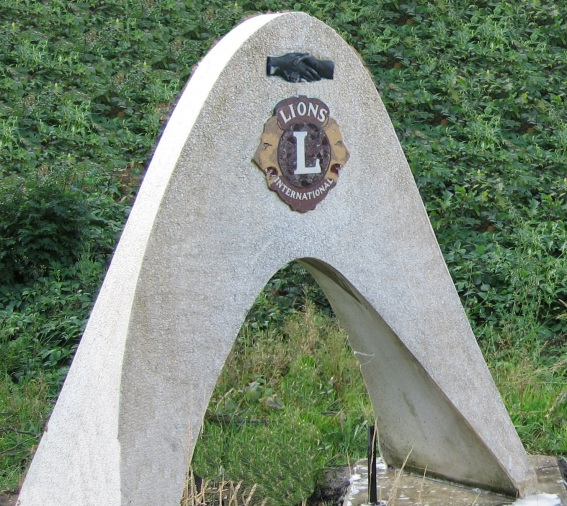
Lions Club Bridge in Aachen, Germany

Lions Clubs International Foundation is "Lions helping Lions serve the world". Donations provide funding in the form of grants to financially assist Lions districts with large-scale humanitarian projects that are too expensive and costly for Lions to finance on their own. The Foundation aids Lions in making a greater impact in their local communities, as well as around the world. Major initiatives of the foundation include the following:

- SightFirst programs
  - Childhood Blindness Project
  - Lions Eye Health Program (LEHP, pronounced "leap")
  - River blindness/Trachoma
  - SightFirst China Action
  - Sight for Kids
- Other sight programs
  - Core 4 Preschool
  - Vision Screening
- Disability programs
  - Lions World Services for the Blind
  - Diabetes Prevention/Treatment
  - Habitat for Humanity Partnership
  - Lions Affordable Hearing Aid Project
  - Low Vision
  - Special Olympics Opening Eyes
- Youth Programs
  - LEO Clubs
  - Lions Quest
  - Lion Cubs
- Highest Club recognitions
  - Model Clubs
  - 100|100 Clubs

=== SightFirst ===
Upon endorsing the biggest ever collaborative disease eradication program called the London Declaration on Neglected Tropical Diseases launched on 30 January 2012 in London, the organization has implemented SightFirst program by which it aims to eradicate blindness due to trachoma, one of the neglected tropical diseases. It has allocated over US$11 million in 10 countries for eye surgeries, medical training, distribution of Zithromax and tetracycline, and sanitary services. It has also announced US$6.9 million funding to support the Government of China for the same cause.

== Membership ==
Membership in the Lions Club is by "invitation only" as mandated by its constitution and by-laws. All member applicants need a sponsor who is an active member and of good standing in the club they intend to join. While sponsorship may be obtained by an applicant in order to become a legitimate member, sponsorship is no guarantee of membership. Acceptance of membership is still subject to the approval of the majority of the club's board of directors. Approval criteria include being able to invest time and money in the club, and being perceived as a person of good moral character in one's community. Attendance at meetings is encouraged on a monthly or fortnightly basis. Due to the hierarchical nature of Lions Clubs International, members have the opportunity to advance from a local club to an office at the zone, district, multiple district, and international levels.

In 1987 the constitution of Lions Clubs International was amended to allow for women to become members.

Among the famous and noteworthy members of Lions International are former U.S. President Jimmy Carter, Sophie, Duchess of Edinburgh, a member of the Wokingham Lions Club and Royal Patron of the Lions Clubs of the British Isles, C. P. Radhakrishnan, and Sir Edmund Hillary, a member of the Remuera Lions Club in New Zealand.

== Expansion ==
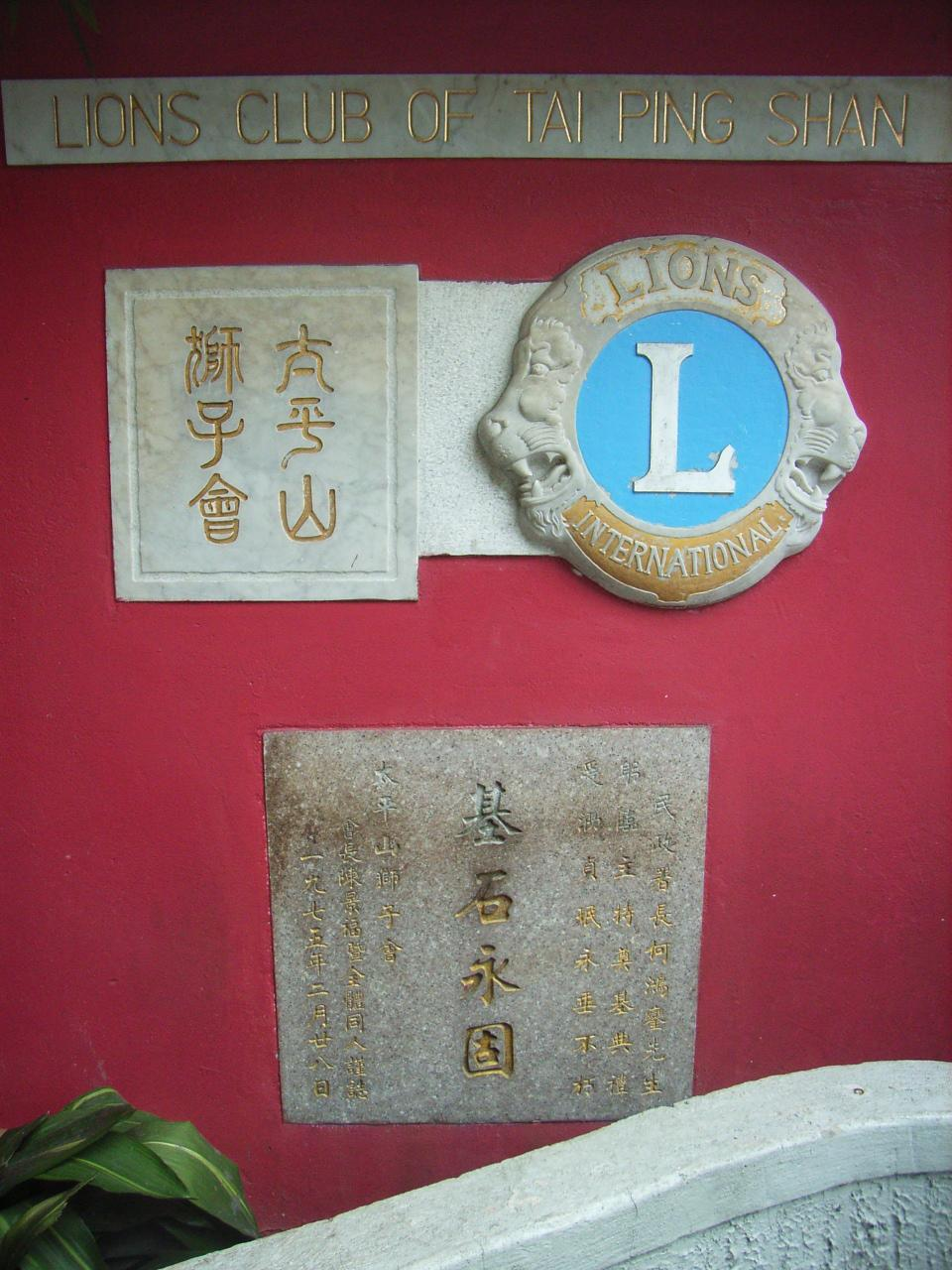
International Lions Club Hong Kong.

Map showing Lions Clubs involvement around the globe.

Lions International Building visible in Chicago in 1970.

The organization expanded internationally on 12 March 1920, when a club opened in Windsor, Ontario, Canada. In 1937 the club expanded to San Juan in Puerto Rico. Currently Lions Clubs operate in more than 200 countries and have over 1.4 million members.

Saudi Arabia was one of the last countries without a Lions Club. The first Chartered Club in Saudi was founded by a Filipino group from Batangas in the year 2019. The club was named Batangas-Saudi 101 Lions Club.

== Convention ==
An international convention is held annually in cities across the globe for members to meet other Lions, elect the coming year's officers, and partake in the many activities planned. At the convention, Lions can participate in elections and parades, display and discuss fundraisers and service projects, and trade pins and other souvenirs. The first convention was held in 1917, the first year of the club's existence, in Dallas, Texas. The 2006 convention was due to be held in New Orleans, but damage sustained during Hurricane Katrina meant that the convention had to be relocated to Boston.
