= Fort Thomas High School =

Coordinates: 33°02′03″N 109°57′52″W

Location
- 15502 W. Hwy 70; Fort Thomas, Arizona 85536; United States

Information
- School type: Public high school
- School district: Fort Thomas Unified School District
- Principal: McKay DeSpain
- Teaching staff: 26.00 (FTE)
- Grades: 7-12
- Enrollment: 261 (2023–2024)
- Student to teacher ratio: 10.04
- Colors: Royal blue and gold
- Mascot: Apaches
- Website: fths.ftusd.org/o/fths

Fort Thomas High School is a high school serving grades 7–12 in Fort Thomas, Arizona. It is operated by the Fort Thomas Unified School District, which also operates an elementary school. Combined, the two schools have some 600 students; 93% of the student body is Native American. The original school building, used since 1925 and renovated since, was damaged in a 1959 fire and restored later in the year.
