= San Carlos Apache Indian Reservation =

Native American reservation in Arizona

Coordinates: 33°19′58″N 110°09′40″W

San Carlos Apache Nation
Tsékʼáádn (Western Apache)
- Location of San Carlos Apache Indian Reservation

Total population
- 16,250

Regions with significant populations
- United States (Arizona)

Languages
- Western Apache, Spanish, English

Religion
- Traditional Tribal Religions, Christianity (especially Lutheranism)

Related ethnic groups
- Apache, Navajo(Diné)

The San Carlos Apache Indian Reservation (Western Apache: Tsékʼáádn), in southeastern Arizona, United States, was established in 1872 as a reservation for the Chiricahua Apache tribe as well as surrounding Yavapai and Apache bands removed from their original homelands under a strategy devised by General George Crook of setting the various Apache tribes against one another. Once nicknamed "Hell's Forty Acres" during the late 19th century due to poor health and environmental conditions, modern San Carlos Apaches operate a Chamber of Commerce, the Apache Gold and Apache Sky Casinos, a Language Preservation program, a Culture Center, and a Tribal College.

== History ==
On December 14, 1872, President U.S. Grant established the San Carlos Apache Reservation. The government gave various religious groups responsibility for managing the new reservations, and the Dutch Reformed Church was in charge of the San Carlos Apache Indian Reservation. The church chose John Clum, who turned down the position twice before accepting the commission as Indian Agent for the San Carlos Apache Indian Reservation in the Arizona Territory on February 16, 1874.

The U.S. Army showed both animosity toward the Indians and disdain for the civilian Indian Agents. Soldiers and their commanding officers sometimes brutally tortured or killed the Indians for sport while politicians in Washington, D.C., knew little about differences in tribal cultures, customs, and language. The 8th Cavalry was stationed in Arizona during this time until 1875. Politicians also ignored political differences and military alliances and tried to apply a "one-size-fits-all" strategy to deal with the "Indian problem". As a result, tribal friends and foes were forced to live in close proximity to one another. Meanwhile, the Apaches were supposed to be fed and housed by their caretakers, but they rarely saw the federal money and suffered as a result.

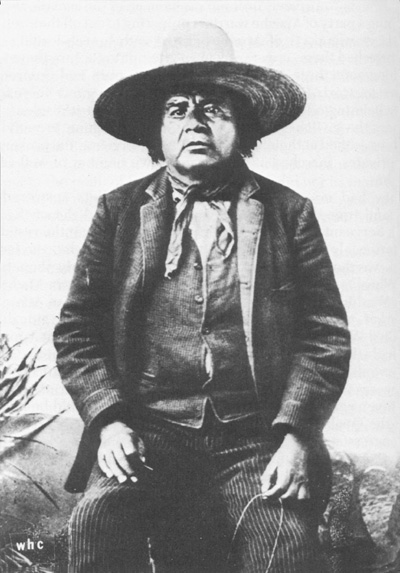
Eskiminzin, an Aravaipa Apache chief

Clum arrived at the reservation on August 4, 1874. During his tenure at San Carlos, he struck a lifelong friendship with Eskiminzin, an Aravaipa Apache chief, and persuaded many of the White Mountain people to move south to San Carlos. Clum won the Indians' confidence and the Apaches responded by turning in their weapons. The Apaches formed a tribal court to try minor infractions and joined the Tribal Police organized under Clum's command, which helped to form a system of limited Indian self-rule. The agent soon attracted 4,200 Apache and Yavapai Indians to the semi-arid reservation. The Army bristled at Clum's actions because they prevented them from taking part of the funds that passed through the reservation.

In 1875, Buffalo Soldiers of the 9th Cavalry from Texas replaced the 8th Cavalry in Arizona. The 9th Cavalry would stay in Arizona until 1881. On April 21, 1877, Clum, along with 100 of his best Apache Police, captured Geronimo at the Ojo Caliente Reservation in the New Mexico Territory. The U.S. Army, which had mounted intense efforts to track down and capture Geronimo, was seriously embarrassed by Clum's success. Indian Bureau administrators and U.S. Army commanders disliked Clum's methods and continually frustrated his efforts. Clum finally resigned, and the reservation's new administrators released Geronimo, resulting in more than 15 years of conflict across the American southwest.

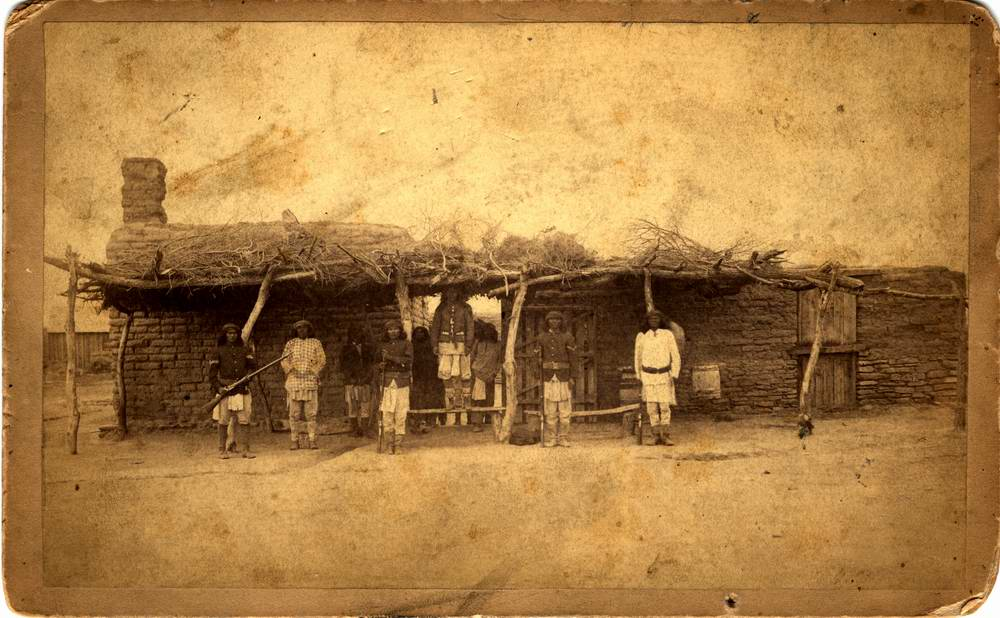
Guard House in San Carlos, Arizona circa 1880. Photograph by Camillus S. Fly.

=== Tribes consolidated ===
In March 1875, the government closed the Yavapai–Apache Camp Verde Reservation and marched the residents 180 miles (290 km) to the San Carlos Apache Indian Reservation. 375 Yavapai perished in the ensuing Indian Removal deportations out of the 1,400 deported.

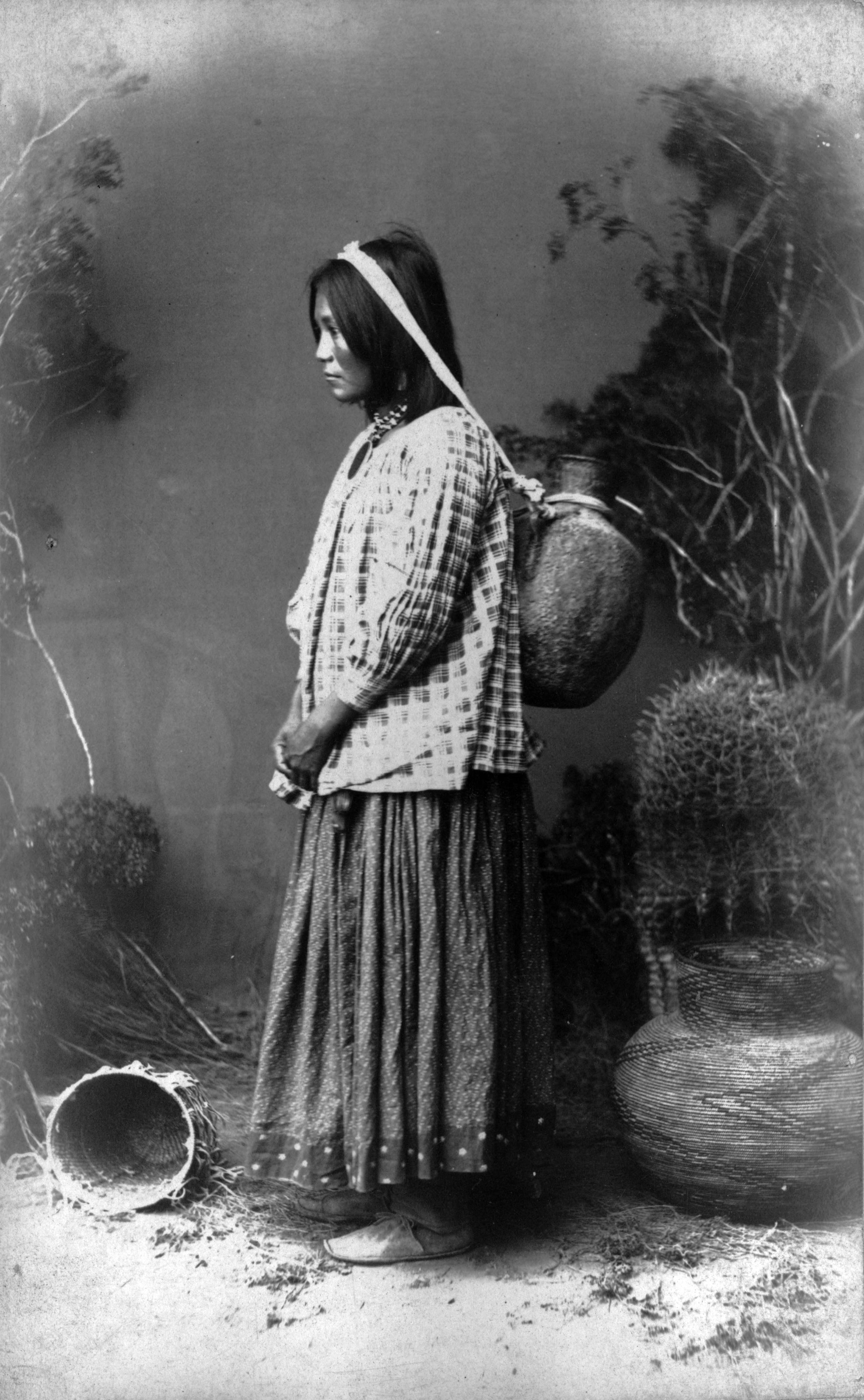
San Carlos Apache woman

After the Chiricahuan Apache were deported east to Florida in 1886, San Carlos became the reservation for various other relocated Apachean-speaking groups. These included the Pinal Coyotero of the northern Gila River area, the former San Carlos Apache bands Aravaipa (also Arivaipa or Tsee Zhinnee), Pinaleño (also Pinal Apache or Tiis Ebah Nnee), Apache Peaks (also called Bichi Lehe Nnee), and San Carlos proper (also Tiis Zhaazhe Bikoh or ′Small Cottonwood Canyon People′), the former Canyon Creek, Carrizo Creek and Cibecue bands of the Cibecue Apache.

Today the Community Cibecue is part of the Fort Apache Reservation of the White Mountain Apache, historically with the communities Cedar Creek and Carrizo of the Cibecue Apache territory, various bands of Southern Tonto Apache, Tsiltaden ("mountainside people", a clan or band of the Chiricahua Apache a part of the Pinaleño), some Eastern White Mountain Apache (Dził Ghą́ʼ oder Dzil Ghaa a or 'On Top of Mountains People'), and the Lipan, Dzil Dlaazhe (Mount Turnbull Apache, a mixed Kwevekapaya San Carlos Apache band). By the early 1900s, Yavapais were drifting away from the San Carlos Reservation and were requesting permission to live at the original Camp Verde Reservation.

After the Indian Reorganization Act of 1934, the various Apache groups formed a government and became federally recognized as the San Carlos Nation. Grenville Goodwin, an anthropologist who had lived with the Western Apache since the late 1920s, helped them to decide what government they wanted to form under the new law to gain more sovereignty.

== Current growth and development ==
In 1999, the San Carlos Apache founded the Apache Nation Chamber of Commerce [ANCC] to "create environments that ensure the greatest opportunity to succeed, and to become self-sufficient for Indigenous and all communities." The ANCC encourages individuals and corporations to form business relationships with Arizona's tribal governments.

The San Carlos Apache Tribe Wellness Center, established in 2003, is a tribally run out-patient mental health and substance abuse program. The new expanded clinic includes two round group rooms designed to simulate traditional Apache wickiups as well as sky lights to bring natural lighting into interior spaces and outside meeting space.

The San Carlos Apache Tribe's Language Preservation Program, located in Peridot, Arizona, began its outreach in 2011 to the 14,000 tribal members to help preserve and develop the Apache language.

In 2014, tribal Chairman Terry Rambler announced the establishment of the San Carlos Tribal College. The tribe signed a memorandum of understanding with Arizona State University to help develop curriculum for its proposed two-year Associate degree.

== Resolution Copper controversy ==
In December 2014, President Barack Obama signed the 2015 National Defense Authorization Act, which would give land sacred to the Apache in Arizona to Resolution Copper Mine (RCM), a joint venture owned by Rio Tinto and BHP Billiton. The Act cleared the way for the land swap in which Resolution Copper would receive 2,422 acres of National Forest land in exchange for deeding to the federal government 5,344 acres of private land.

A proposal or rider in Section 3003 of the Act, titled "Southeast Arizona Land Exchange and Conservation Act", would allow RCM to develop and operate an underground copper mine 7,000-feet deep (approximately five Empire State buildings) in the publicly owned Tonto National Forest near Superior, Arizona. The land contains more than 2,400 acres of the Oak Flat Campground, an area dotted with petroglyphs and historic and prehistoric sites. Said former San Carlos Apache tribal chairman Wendsler Nosie Sr. of the Act's attached rider: "This is Congressional politics at its wors[t], a hidden agenda that destroys human rights and religious rights."

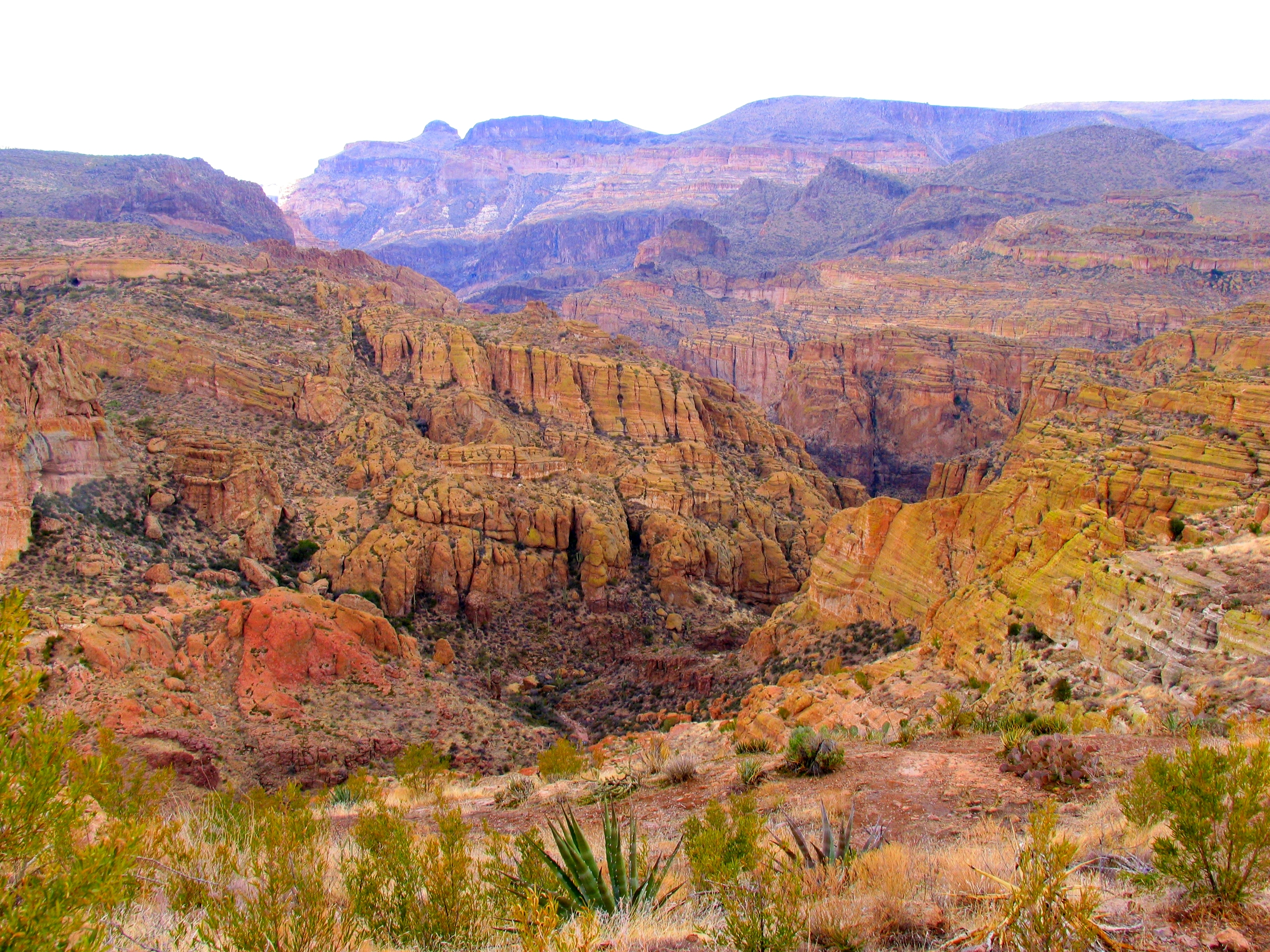
Tonto National Forest

The San Carlos Apache Tribe, under the leadership of Chairman Terry Rambler, has led a strong opposition to the RCM land exchange. Both the National Audubon Society in Tucson and the Grand Canyon Chapter of the Sierra Club in Arizona along with the National Congress of American Indians have joined in the fight to Resolution's land grab. Native American groups and conservationists worry about the impact to surrounding areas, including the steep cliffs at Apache Leap. James Anaya, former United Nations special rapporteur on the rights of indigenous peoples, said that without community and tribal support, Rio Tinto should abandon its Resolution Copper mining project. United States Secretary of the Interior Sally Jewell said she was "profoundly disappointed with the Resolution Copper provision, which has no regard for lands considered sacred by nearby Indian tribes".

By January 2015 over 10,004,000 had signed a petition to President Obama, "We the People|Stop Apache Land Grab". Jodi Gillette, Special Assistant to the President for Native American Affairs, quickly gave an official White House response, vowing that the Obama administration will work with Resolution Copper's parent company Rio Tinto to determine how to work with the tribes to preserve their sacred areas.

In March 2016, the Oak Flat campground was listed on the National Register of Historic Places. While the designated site, which is identified by the National Register as the "Chi'chil Bildagoteel Historic District" will not stop the Resolution Copper mine, a federal agency must evaluate the project's effects on the property before taking action. Bills introduced in 2015 by Sen. Bernie Sanders (D-Vermont) and Rep. Raúl Grijalva (D-Tucson) would reverse the land-exchange deal, but neither received a hearing. New legislation was introduced by Rep. Grijalva on January 17, 2019, with the promise of a companion bill in the Senate to be sponsored by Bernie Sanders.

== Population ==
As of August 2014, the San Carlos Apache tribe had an enrollment of 15,393 tribal members. As of 2018, approximately 9,945–10,945 lived on the Reservation.

The San Carlos Reservation's annual median household income of approximately $27,542, according to the US census. About 49.2 percent of the people live under the poverty line, and 36.7 percent of the active labor force is unemployed.

== Geography ==
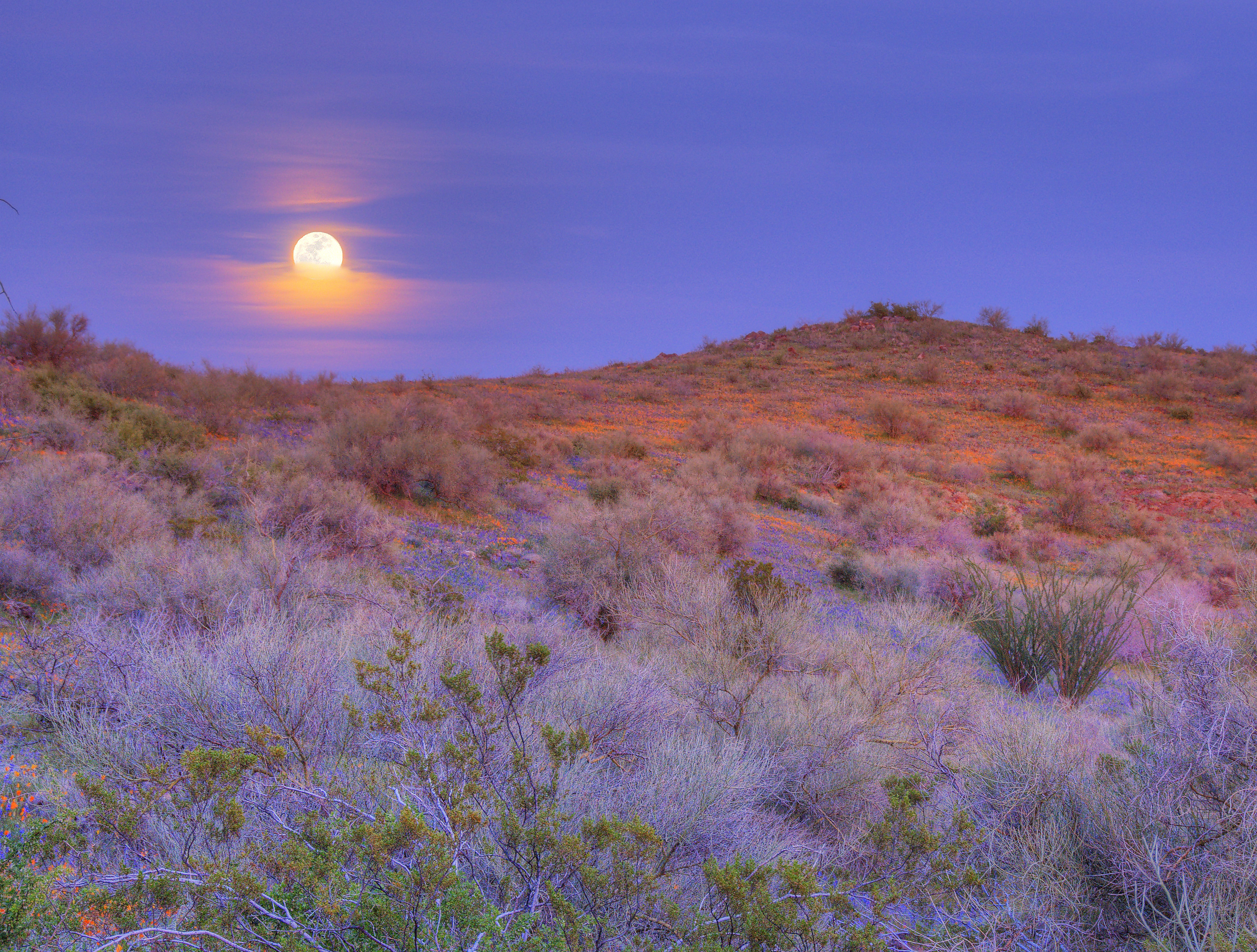
Moonrise over San Carlos Apache Indian Reservation

The San Carlos Apache Indian Reservation encompasses 1.8 million acres of land area in northern Graham, southeastern Gila, and eastern Pinal Counties. The reservation's communities include Bylas, Gilson Wash, Peridot, San Carlos, and 7mile. The San Carlos Lake was formed by the construction of Coolidge Dam and is the second largest body of water in Arizona. The reservation is the tenth-largest Indian reservation in land area with desert, alpine meadows, and Ponderosa Pine forest. The Fort Apache Indian Reservation, which has a smaller land area, is directly north.

The reservation is also home to one of the most productive localities in the world for peridot, hosting the precious gem as nodules within the vesicular basaltic rocks found at Peridot Mesa. The prominent mesa rises about 90 meters from the surrounding desert environment. Having been worked since at least the late 19th century, the mesa hosts many small open pit mines excavated into the host vesicular basalt. Due to the protected status of the locality there are strict rules regarding mining in the area; being open only to tribal members or from permission by the tribe via a permit.

== Transportation ==
U.S. Route 70 traverses the reservation from north to south.

San Carlos Apache Nnee Bich'o Nii Transit provides transportation within the reservation, as well as service to Globe and Safford. Greyhound Lines serves Bylas and Peridot on its Phoenix–El Paso via Globe route.

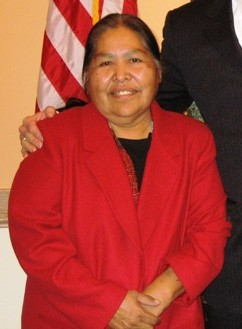
Kathy Kitcheyan, former chairwoman of the San Carlos Apache

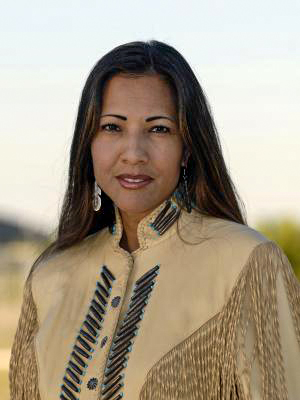
Mary Kim Titla, award-winning reporter/anchor

== Attractions ==
- The San Carlos Apache Culture Center tells the stories and history of the Apache people.
- The Apache Gold Casino, owned and operated by the San Carlos Apache Nation, offers gaming, dining and lodging.
- The San Carlos Recreation and Wildlife Department offers hunting, fishing, boating, camping, birdwatching, and nature study on the scenic 2,900-square-mile (7,500 km^{2}) reservation. Tribal permits (required) available from local convenience and sporting-goods stores.

== Notable tribal members ==
- Earl Gardner (murderer), serial killer hanged in 1936 for three murders
- Lynnette Haozous, artist
- Valerie Key-Cheney, tribal council member (2018–present)
- Evalena Henry, basket weaver
- Barbara May, tribal council member (2020–present)
- Douglas Miles, artist and founder of Apache Skateboards
- Ina Salter, tribal council member (2022–present)
- Mary Kim Titla, former reporter/anchor for the NBC-TV affiliate in Phoenix
- Chesley Goseyun Wilson, actor and maker of the Apache violin
- Sam Ybarra, Vietnam War veteran and alleged war criminal

== See also ==
- San Carlos Apache Police Department
- Rattlesnake Fire (2018)
- Oak Flat: A Fight for Sacred Land in the American West
