= U.S. Route 70 in Arizona =

Highway in Arizona

U.S. Route 70
- Old West Highway
- US 70 highlighted in red

Route information
- Maintained by ADOT
- Length: 122.08 mi (196.47 km)
- Existed: June 17, 1935–present
- History: Designated US 180 from 1926 to 1935; Original US 70 was between Holbrook and New Mexico

Major junctions
- West end: US 60 / SR 77 in Globe
- SR 77 in Globe; US 191 in Safford; SR 75 in Duncan
- East end: US 70 near Virden, New Mexico

Location
- Country: United States
- State: Arizona
- Counties: Gila, Graham, Greenlee

Highway system
- United States Numbered Highway System; List; Special; Divided; Arizona State Highway System; Interstate; US; State; Scenic Proposed; Former
← SR 69T	→ SR 71

U.S. Route 70 (US 70), also known as the Old West Highway, is an east–west U.S. Highway in the U.S. state of Arizona. The current route starts at US 60 in Globe and runs through the San Carlos Indian Reservation, Safford and Duncan into New Mexico near Virden. In Arizona, US 70 passes through mostly isolated hilly and mountainous terrain largely paralleling the course of the Gila River and the Arizona Eastern Railway.

From 1926 to 1932, US 70 was designated further north than it is today. It originally ran from US 66 in Holbrook through St. Johns to the New Mexico state line east of Springerville. Today, US 180 and US 60 serve this route. The highway between Globe and New Mexico was previously designated as part of the original US 180 from 1926 to 1935. Starting in 1935, US 70 ran entirely concurrent with US 60 from Globe to Los Angeles, California. US 70 was gradually truncated to its current terminus in Globe between 1964 and 1969.

== Route description ==
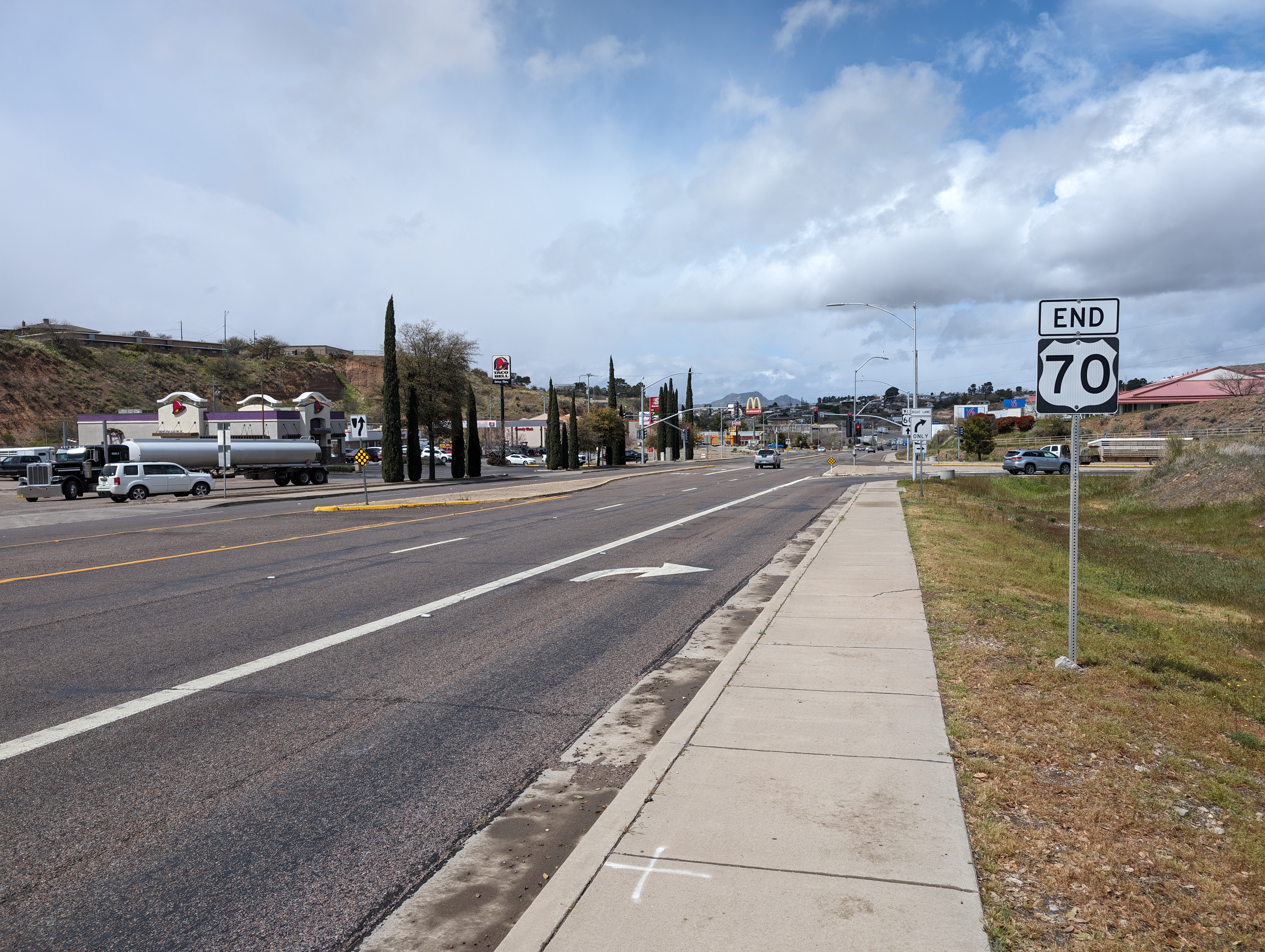
Western terminus in Globe

U.S. Route 70 (US 70) begins in Globe at an intersection with US 60 and State Route 77 (SR 77). Both US 70 and SR 77 proceed southeast on Ash Street through the eastern side of Globe. Shortly after leaving town, SR 77 splits off and heads south towards Tucson, while US 70 continues southeast, then east, entering the San Carlos Indian Reservation. The highway parallels the Arizona Eastern Railway to Cutter, where the railroad curves northeast towards San Carlos. Cutter is also where US 70 has an intersection with the western terminus of Bureau of Indian Affairs Route 170 (BIA 170). From this point, US 70 continues east through isolated rolling hills, surrounded by mountains and thick desert brush. About 12 miles (19 km) east of Cutter, US 70 intersects with BIA 170 again at an interchange in Peridot. The interchange also includes access to BIA 3, which is the main route to the Coolidge Dam. Past the interchange, US 70 crosses over the Arizona Eastern Railway and San Carlos River into Graham County.

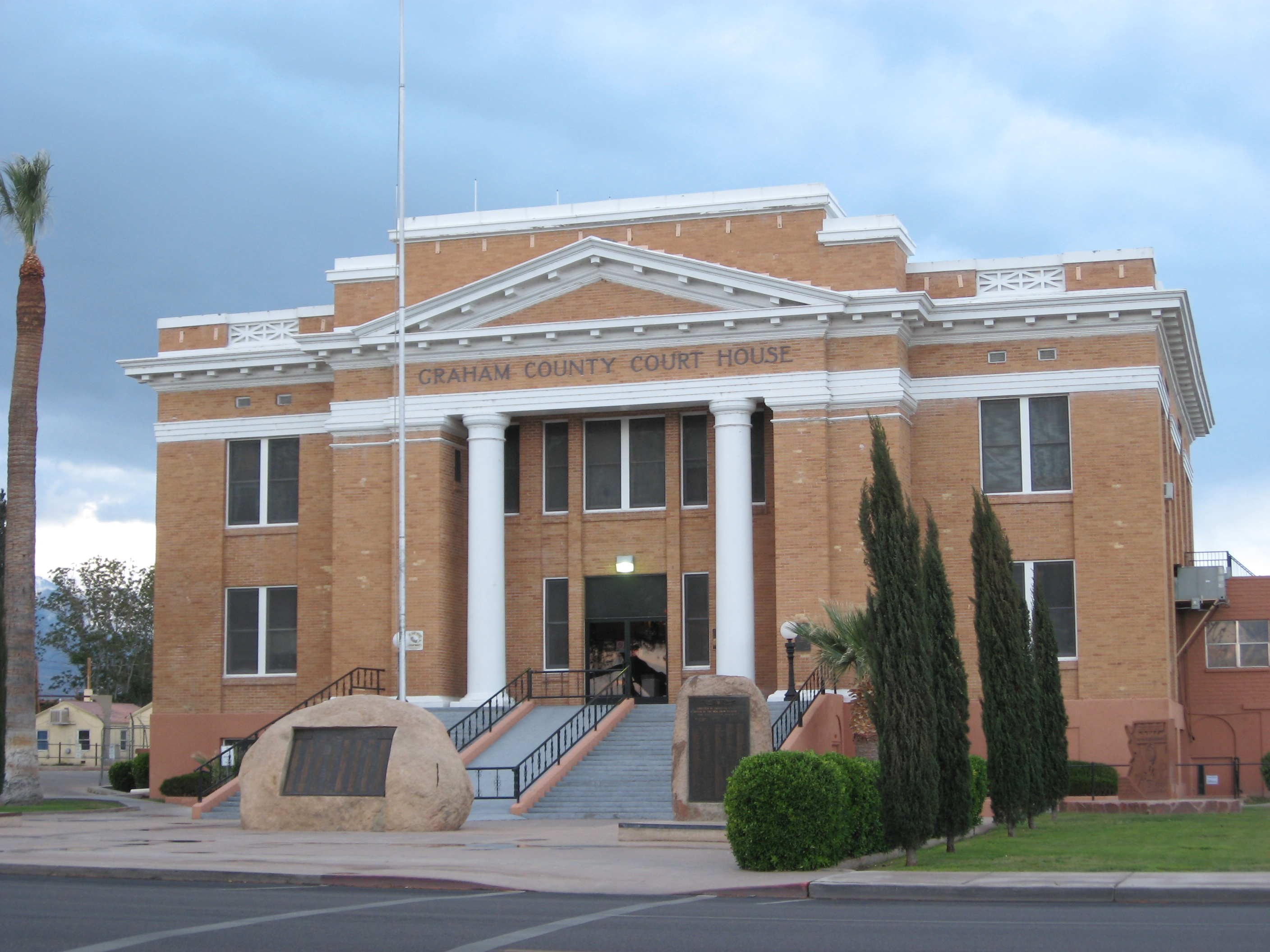
The Graham County courthouse on US 70 in Safford

After entering Graham County, US 70 passes through more isolated desert terrain. The only notable location between Peridot and the Gila River is an intersection with BIA 8. Approximately 21 miles (34 km) east of Peridot, US 70 crosses the Gila River over a bridge before meeting Coolidge Dam Road (BIA 3) at an intersection near Calva. Directly south of the intersection, the Arizona Eastern Railway once again parallels US 70 as does the Gila River. Southeast of the Coolidge Dam intersection, US 70 leaves the rugged stark terrain and enters the farmlands of the Gila River valley. The highway then heads east through the rural communities of Bylas and Fort Thomas before reaching the town of Pima. To the northwest of Pima, mile markers jump from 314 to 326. The milepost equation exists as a result of relocating the highway away from Coolidge Dam. US 70 is the main street through Pima and is known locally as Center Street. East of Pima, US 70 passes through Central, then goes through the town of Thatcher as Main Street. Main Street curves southeast becoming Thatcher Boulevard as Thatcher transitions into the larger town of Safford, where US 70 makes a short half block jog to the south becoming 5th Street. At 1st Street, US 70 has a junction with US 191 at a traffic controlled intersection. US 70 and US 191 then head east in a concurrency out of Safford. East of Safford, the Globe branch of the Arizona Eastern Railway splits off from US 70 for the last time, heading southeast towards Bowie.

East of Safford, US 70 and US 191 continue east into Solomon. Sanchez Road in Solomon provides access to Safford Regional Airport, just north of the small community. Both highways then continue east past San Jose. San Jose is home to the Safford State Prison, located just northeast of current US 70 and US 191 on Old Highway 70. The Gila River also splits off from paralleling US 70 here and heads northeast towards the Gila Box Riparian National Conservation Area. Just southeast of San Jose, US 191 diverges from US 70 heading northeast towards Morenci and Springerville. US 70 proceeds east through flat empty terrain, before entering a small range of mountains, where it crosses into Greenlee County. Upon exiting the mountains, US 70 meets the Gila River and a different branch of the Arizona Eastern Railway in the town of Duncan. In Duncan, US 70 is known as Railroad Avenue. At Main Street, US 70 serves as the southern terminus of SR 75, which proceeds north, following the Gila River to Three Way. SR 73 also provides access to Virden Highway, which becomes New Mexico State Road 92. Southeast of Duncan, US 70 enters the hamlet of Franklin. Southeast of Franklin, the railroad goes in a separate direction towards Lordsburg, where US 70 curves east into New Mexico also heading towards Lordsburg.

== History ==
In Arizona, US 70 has had two different routings in its history. Despite being one of the original U.S. Highways designated in 1926, US 70 only ran along its current alignment since 1935. Earlier in the highway's history, US 70 was designated further north than it is now, and served a small area of northeastern Arizona. The Globe–New Mexico route was previously numbered as US 180. Both alignments of US 70 also have preceding highways and trails that date back to the 19th century. After multiple reroutings and redesignations, the US 70 and US 180 designations have essentially switched routes.

=== U.S. Route 180 (1926–1935) ===
U.S. Route 180
- Location: Florence Junction to New Mexico
- Length: 179.9 mi (289.5 km)
- Existed: 1926–1935

Map showing the final route of US 180 highlighted in red. US 70, its modern counterpart, is highlighted in grey underneath US 180 for comparison.

U.S. Route 180 (US 180) was the original U.S. Highway designation between Globe and the New Mexico state border near Virden. Being one of the original U.S. Highways established in 1926, it was the first child route of US 80 to be designated. The route was originally designated in 1909 when the Arizona Territorial Legislature established a territorial road system under the management of the Territorial Engineer. The Yuma–Duncan Territorial Road ran between Yuma in the west and the New Mexico territorial line near Duncan. Despite being a territorial designated road, improvements to the two existing territorial roads was slow due to low funding. No improvements were made to the Yuma–Duncan Road between 1909 and 1912, with all funding going towards the Grand Canyon–Duncan Territorial Road between the Grand Canyon area and Douglas. In 1912, Arizona Territory was granted statehood, which changed the organization of the Territorial Road System into the new State Highway System. The Yuma–Duncan route became part of the transcontinental Southern National Highway auto trail in 1913. In 1914, Arizona's highway system was further reorganized into a better-funded and organized network of early state highways. The Yuma–Duncan route between Globe and New Mexico was added to the newly designated Roosevelt Dam Highway. The rest of the new route ran from Mesa to Globe via the Apache Trail (now SR 88).

In 1919, the Roosevelt Dam Highway became a northern branch of the Lee Highway auto trail. Due to the popularity of the Lee Highway, the state-designated Roosevelt Dam name became largely forgotten by the traveling public. Between 1917 and 1921, the route from Solomonsville to Geronimo was paved. It along with the Borderland Highway between Bisbee and Douglas became the first two paved state highways in Arizona. With a second reorganization of the state highway system in 1921 due in part to newly available federal funding, the eastern section of the Roosevelt Dam Highway was redesignated by the state to become part the Phoenix–Globe–Rice Highway and the entirety of the Rice–Safford–Duncan Highway. By this point, a previously existing more direct route between San Jose and Duncan had been added as a branch of the Rice–Safford–Duncan Highway. In 1924, funding allocated by Federal Aid Project No. 15 allowed the state to improve the conditions of the Phoenix–Globe–Rice Highway between Globe and Geronimo. Both the Phoenix–Globe–Rice Highway and Rice–Safford–Duncan Highway were designated as the new US 180 on November 11, 1926. With the establishment of Arizona's own highway numbering system on September 9, 1927, the US 180 designation was officially recognized by the State Highway Department and the earlier state designations were dropped.

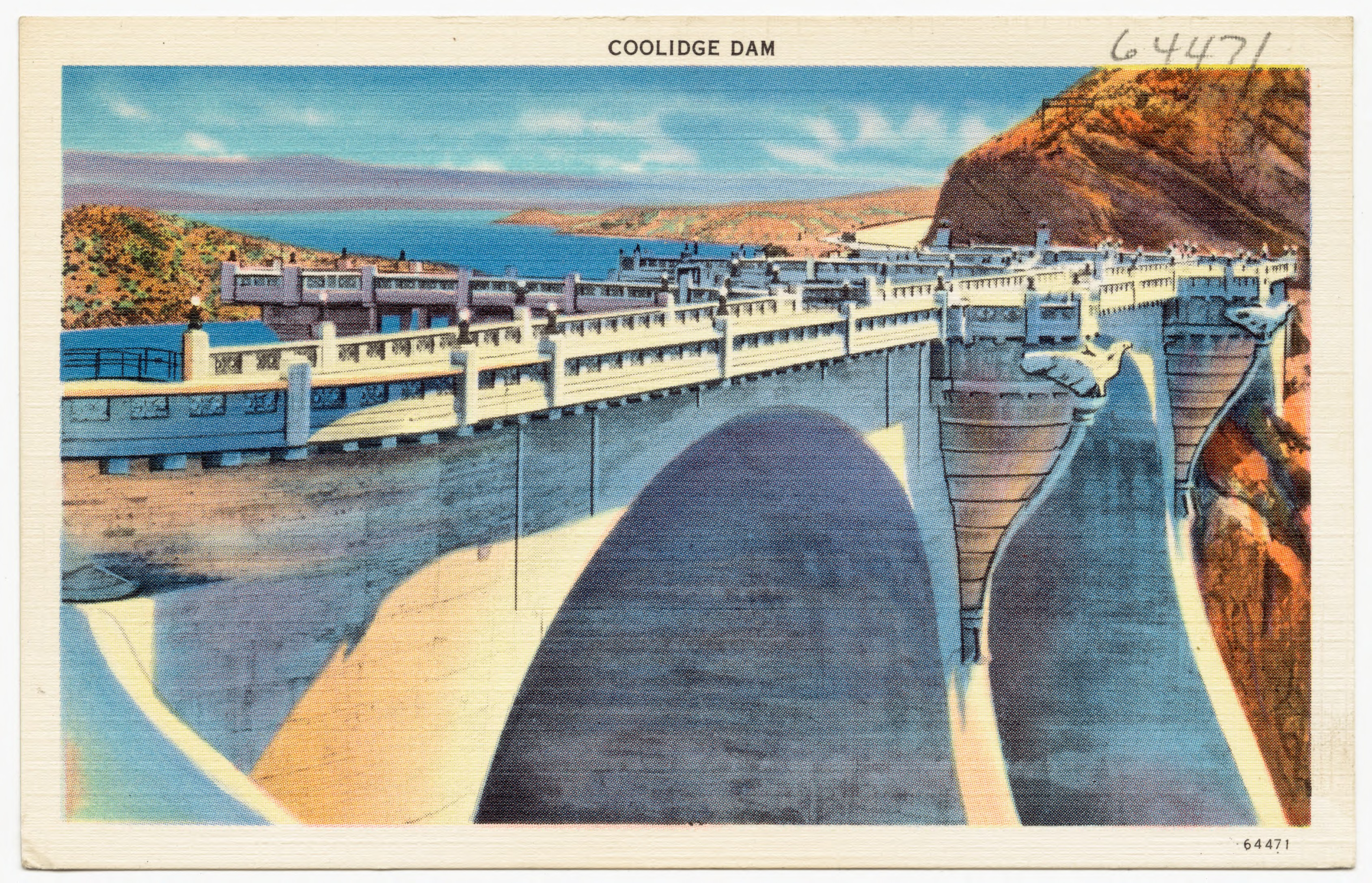
A postcard of US 70 (originally US 180) going across the top of Coolidge Dam.

At first, US 180 was a mostly unpaved highway, save for the aforementioned section between Geronimo and Solomonsville. The entire route was at least graded with most of it being of an improved surface other than true pavement. A new section of US 180 was also under construction to bypass the route between Cutter and Rice (now San Carlos). The new route would go over the Coolidge Dam around the new San Carlos reservoir. Construction of the dam itself was approved by the United States Congress on June 7, 1924. The purpose of the dam was to help solve water issues plaguing the Apache people living within the San Carlos Indian Reservation. Heavy irrigation of the Gila River for farming upstream had greatly decreased the amount of water available in the river to the Apache Nation. Construction of the Coolidge Dam was started in January 1927 and completed in October 1928. Water retaining began on November 15, 1928, and was placed under management of the San Carlos Project, a division of the Bureau of Indian Affairs (BIA).

Historical US 70 route markers

1926 design

1956 design (Eastbound)

1956 design (Westbound)

1960 design (Eastbound)

1960 design (Westbound)

1963 design

1971 design (used after 1991)

At first, construction of the dam faced massive opposition from the Apache Nation as a tribal burial ground was within the area of the proposed reservoir. Exhumation of any human remains was out of the question, as the Apache people considered it desecration. The BIA therefore constructed a concrete slab over the burial ground allowing the BIA and Apache Nation to reach a compromise. By 1929, US 180 had been re-routed onto the new alignment over the Coolidge Dam. The section of former US 180 between Rice and a point northwest of Geronimo was abandoned from the state highway system. SR 73, which had previously ended at US 180 in Rice, was extended west over former US 180 to end at the new highway in Cutter. Due to limited state funding, the new alignment wasn't paved, but was instead oiled down to provide some stability and rigidity. Approximately 23.5 miles (37.8 kilometres) was oiled between Globe and Safford at a cost of $88,904. A large amount of the oiling and construction cost was reimbursed by the federal government.

US 180 was paved from Globe to the Pinal County line near the Coolidge Dam by 1930. Besides the already paved segment of highway near Safford, the rest of the highway was surfaced with a lesser improved material, save for a section between Duncan and the New Mexico border, which wasn't surfaced, but was at least graded. Several sections of US 180 were graded and improved with oil surfacing in 1931 under five separate labor projects in both Gila County and Graham County. Most of this work was done between the Coolidge Dam area and Geronimo, costing over $100,000. The total amount of road reconstructed was at least 15 miles (24 kilometres) in length. Later in 1931, US 180 was fully paved between the Gila–Pinal County line to Calva to an area west of Geronimo. When US 60 was extended west to California through Arizona the same year, both highways shared a concurrency between Globe and the US 180's western terminus in Florence Junction. Since US 60 wasn't completed between Globe and Springerville yet, US 180 was concurrent with US 60T (the temporary route of US 60) between Globe and Cutter. US 60T then followed SR 73 northeast from Cutter to Springerville. Paving from Solomonville to the New Mexico state line was completed in 1932. By November 20, 1932, over 183 miles (295 kilometres) of US 180 was surfaced with either pavement or an oiled surface. By 1934, the entirety of US 180 between Globe and New Mexico was now paved. New Mexico had also paved part of its section of US 180 between the Arizona Border and Lordsburg. In October 1934, two bridges were widened on US 180 near Solomonville and two new bridges on the highway were also constructed.

=== Redesignation to U.S. Route 70 ===
US 70 was originally designated in Arizona on November 11, 1926. The route started at US 66 in Holbrook, and ran south to Concho, then east to St. Johns, where the highway turned south again to Springerville, then due east into New Mexico to Clovis, and eventually, its eastern terminus in Beaufort, North Carolina. Prior to 1926, the Arizona portion of US 70 had been a section of Beale's Wagon Road and the National Old Trails Road. On June 8, 1931, US 70 between Holbrook and Clovis was replaced by US 60 and a newly designated US 260. US 70 was given a new routing between Clovis and El Paso, Texas via Alamogordo, New Mexico. US 70 continued to end in El Paso until June 17, 1935, when the highway was re-routed over US 180, retiring the latter route. Nationally, US 70 was re-routed west of Hondo, New Mexico through Carrizozo, San Marcial and Hot Springs to Caballo, New Mexico. From there, US 70 replaced all of US 180 between Caballo, New Mexico and Florence Junction, Arizona. US 70 also ran entirely concurrent with US 60 from Globe into California to a junction with US 99 near Mecca, California. The old route to El Paso became part of US 54. This not only moved the western terminus of US 70 from El Paso to California, but also reintroduced US 70 to the state of Arizona after 4 years of absence. In later years, US 180 would also be re-introduced to Arizona, coincidentally taking over the former route of US 70 between Holbrook and New Mexico.

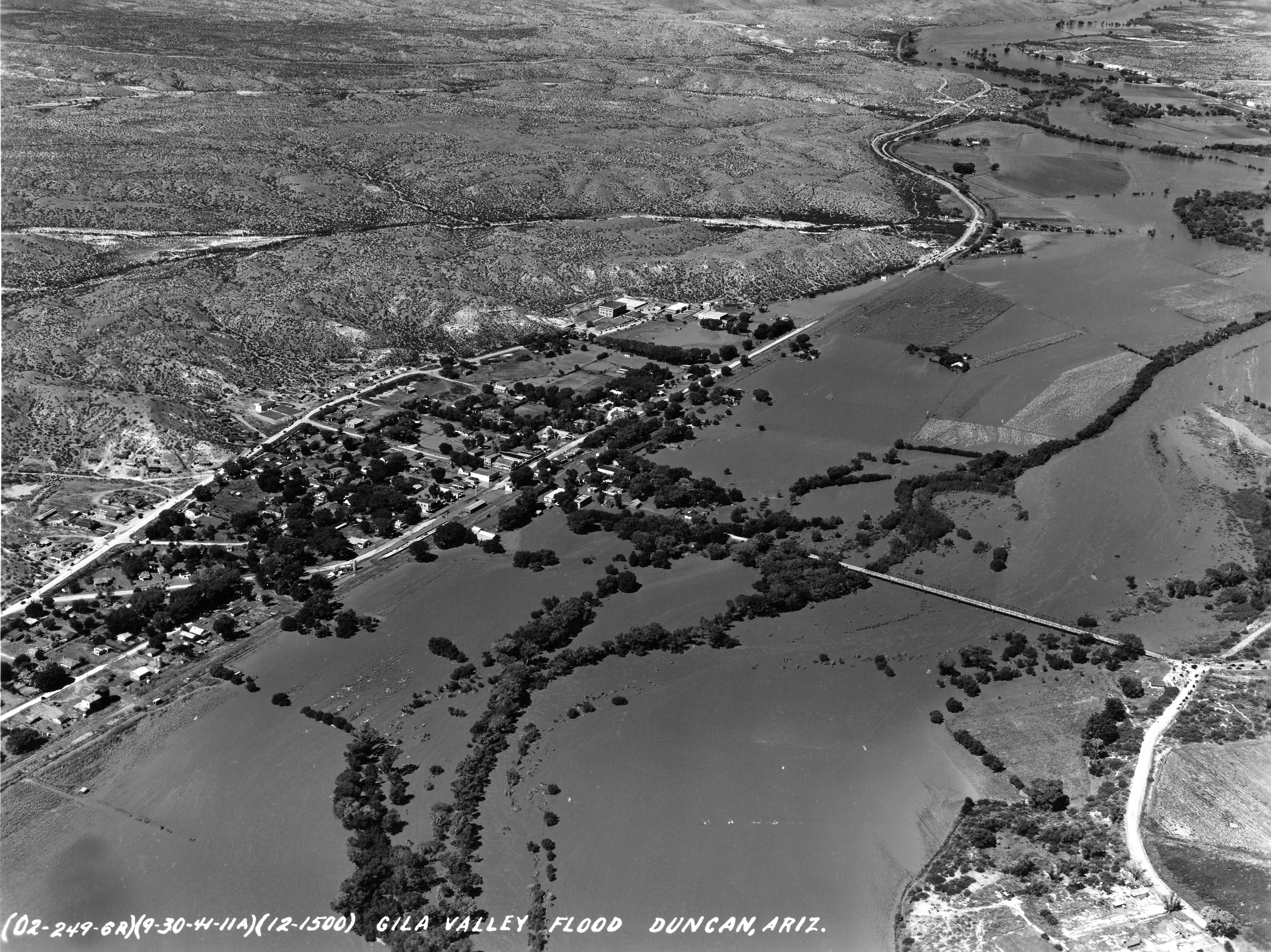
Aerial view of Duncan during the mid-20th century, showing US 70 heading east towards New Mexico

Some adjustments were made to the new routing of US 70 between 1935 and 1936, moving the highway between Hondo and Lordsburg in New Mexico further south through Alamogordo, Las Cruces and Deming. US 70 in California was also extended west over US 60 and US 99 to downtown Los Angeles. This meant that both US 60 and US 70 were now entirely concurrent each other west of Globe, Arizona to a shared western terminus. Despite the route being changed through New Mexico and California, US 70 remained mostly unaltered through Arizona until the mid 1950s. In 1936, the overall length of US 70 in Arizona was 396 miles (637 kilometres), including both the standalone section between Globe and New Mexico and the section entirely concurrent with US 60 between Globe and the Colorado River in Ehrenberg. The Arizona Republic newspaper advertised US 70 as the shortest route across southern Arizona, claiming it was at least 100 miles (160 kilometres) shorter than any other highway crossing the state of Arizona laterally. On June 21, 1937, SR 77 was extended south to Oracle Junction, establishing a short concurrency with US 70 between Globe and an intersection just west of Cutter. In 1939, US 666 was extended south to Douglas from New Mexico, establishing a concurrency with US 70 between Safford and San Jose.

Following the end of World War II in Europe, the Arizona State Highway Department released its postwar highway improvement and construction plans to the press on May 26, 1945. Among the many proposed improvement projects was construction of a new alignment of US 70 between Cutter and Safford, Arizona. The new route was proposed to run around the north side of the San Carlos Reservoir and bypass the Coolidge Dam. On May 29, 1950, the Highway Department initially budgeted $550,000 to begin the new construction project. The allocated funds would go towards building the first segment of the Coolidge Dam bypass from Cutter to Peridot. By December 1951, the new route from Cutter to Peridot was under construction by a private contractor from Globe. The Cutter to Peridot project along with the remaining proposed route was estimated to cost a total of $6 Million when complete and would eliminate 11 miles off the length of US 70.

Construction on the section from Cutter to Peridot was nearing completion in April 1953 with a bridge over Gilson Wash on the route being the last segment under construction. By late 1953, the section between Cutter and Peridot was completed but unpaved. The route was also not yet signed as a state highway. The remainder of the highway between Peridot and Geronimo was now under construction. Construction and improvement on the new route was still undergoing by February 1956, with the bridge over the Gila River and paving of the new route scheduled to be completed by late May. By December 5, 1956, the new section of US 70 had been opened to traffic and the designation re-routed to the newer alignment. The original route over the Coolidge Dam was subsequently abandoned by the State Highway Department. Although the older route is in very rough shape, former US 70 over the Coolidge Dam remains open to car traffic and is now maintained by the BIA as BIA Route 3. The new route was dedicated in an opening ceremony on December 8.

During the 1960s, the days of US 70 being a full transcontinental highway came to an end. During the 1964 California State Highway Renumbering, the US 70 designation eliminated entirely from the state of California, placing the national western terminus of the highway at the Arizona border on the Colorado River in Ehrenberg. On February 13, 1969, US 70 was further truncated to US 60 in Globe, where its western terminus remains to this day. Today, former US 70 between Ehrenberg and Globe is now part of Interstate 10, US 60 and several city and county maintained roads. The remaining section of US 70 has remained mostly unchanged since 1956. Despite its truncation, US 70 remains an important artery between Globe and Safford for the San Carlos Indian Reservation, providing the reservation with an adequate connection to the rest of the state. It also continues to serve as both the main street and through route for the towns of Duncan and Safford. Today, US 70 between the New Mexico state line and US 60 in Globe is designated as part of the Old West Highway, a tourist route established by the Old West History Association in 1994. The Old West Highway designation also extends west from Globe along US 60 to Apache Junction, and east along US 70, across the state line, to Lordsburg.

== Major intersections ==
County	Location	mi (Note: Mile markers begin at 252.14 mi (405.78 km) as US 70 previously extended into California. Mile marker 0 is on I-10 at the California-Arizona state line in Ehrenberg.)	km	Destinations	Notes
Gila	Globe	0.00	0.00	US 60 / SR 77 north – Globe, Phoenix, Show Low, Springerville	Western terminus of US 70; western end of SR 77 concurrency; highway continues as US 60 west (Ash Street)
Gila	Globe	2.06	3.32	SR 77 south – Winkelman, Tucson	Eastern end of SR 77 concurrency
Gila	Peridot	19.18	30.87	BIA Route 3 south (Coolidge Dam Road) / BIA Route 170 west – San Carlos, Coolidge Dam	Interchange via connector road; eastern terminus of BIA 170; former SR 170; northern terminus of BIA 3
San Carlos River		19.40	31.22	Bridge	
Graham	Safford	76.27	122.74	US 191 south (1st Avenue) – Willcox	Western end of US 191 concurrency
Graham		86.32	138.92	US 191 north – Clifton	Eastern end of US 191 concurrency
Greenlee	Duncan	115.75	186.28	SR 75 north (Main Street) – Virden New Mexico	Southern terminus of SR 75
Greenlee		122.08	196.47	US 70 east – Lordsburg	Continuation into New Mexico
1.000 mi = 1.609 km; 1.000 km = 0.621 mi: Concurrency terminus

== See also ==
U.S. Route 70
Previous state: Terminus	Arizona	Next state: New Mexico
