= Indian Reservation Roads Program =

Highway system in the United States

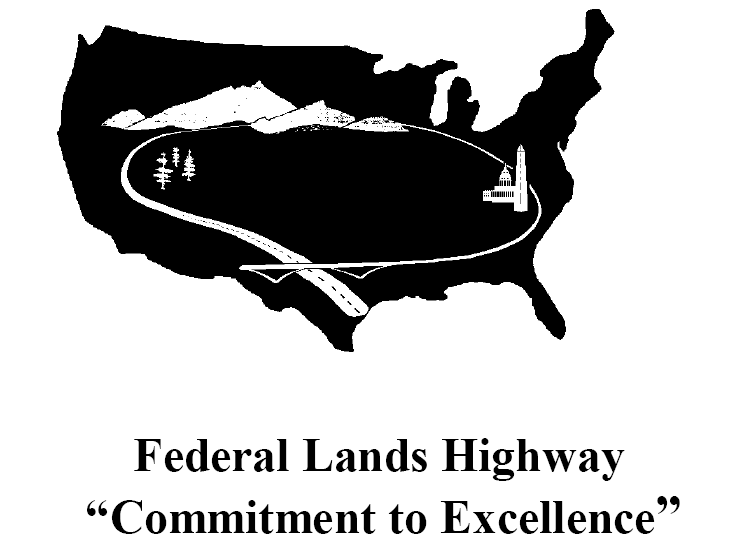
- Federal Lands Highway Program

Agency overview
- Headquarters: Washington, D.C.
- Website: http://flh.fhwa.dot.gov/programs/irr

The Indian Reservation Roads Program (IRR) is part of the Bureau of Indian Affairs (BIA) and is meant to meet the transportation needs of American Indians in the United States, American Indian tribes, and Alaska Natives. These roads, also known as BIA Roads are given to tribes by providing funds for planning, designing, construction, and maintenance activities.

The program is jointly administered by the Federal Lands Highway Program and the BIA. These roads are public that provide access to and within Indian reservations, Indian trust land, restricted Indian land, and Alaska native villages. Approximately 29,000 miles (47,000 km) are under the jurisdiction of the BIA and tribes and another 73,000 miles (117,000 km) are under State and local ownership.

The authorizing legislation is the highway authorization act (currently the Safe, Accountable, Flexible and Efficient Transportation Equity Act – A Legacy for Users (SAFETEA-LU)) and codified in Title 23 U.S.C. and 25 C.F.R. Part 170.

The IRR program funds can be used for any type of Title 23 transportation project providing access to or within Federal or Indian lands and may be used for the State/local matching share for apportioned Federal-aid Highway Funds.

== List of roads ==
Route	Mi	Km	From	To	Notes
BIA Route 1	20	30	Arizona State Route 347 near Maricopa	Arizona State Route 87 in Sacaton Flats	
BIA Route 2	48		Arizona State Route 264 in Kykotsmovi Village	BIA Route 15 near Leupp	
BIA Route 3	23		Coolidge Dam Road in Coolidge Dam	US Route 70 near Bylas	Mostly Concurrent with BIA Route 500
BIA Route 6			US Route 70 in Cutter	BIA Route 170 in San Carlos	
BIA Route 7	53		US Route 191 in Chinle	New Mexico State Line in Fort Defiance	
BIA Route 8	49		County Road 2000 north of Safford	US Route 70 near Peridot	
BIA Route 12	32 __ 38		New Mexico State Line in Fort Defiance ________________________________ US Route 191 in Round Rock	Interstate 40 in Lupton ____________________________ New Mexico State Line near Tsalie	
BIA Route 13	24		BIA Route 12 near Lukachukai	New Mexico State Line in Red Rock	
BIA Route 14					
BIA Route 15	105 — 54		Townsend-Winona Road near Flagstaff ________________________________ Chuichu Road near Casa Grande	Arizona State Route 264/US Route 191 in Burnside ___________________________________ Arizona State Route 86 in Maish Vaya	Longest BIA Route in Arizona
BIA Route 16	36		Utah state line near Navajo Mountain	Arizona State Route 98 west of Kayenta	
BIA Route 18					
BIA Route 20	45		US Route 89 in The Gap	S. Lake Powell Boulevard in Page	Former Alt. Route 89
BIA Route 27	43		BIA Route 7 near Chinle	Arizona State Route 264 near Ganado	
BIA Route 33	13		West of Red Rock	BIA Route 13 in Red Rock	
BIA Route 41					
BIA Route 42					
BIA Route 59	44		US Route 160 near Kayenta	US Route 191 in Many Farms	
BIA Route 60	20	30	Arizona State Route 87 near Dilkon	Arizona State Route 87 near Winslow	
BIA Route 62					
BIA Route 64	28		BIA Route 7 near Chinle	BIA Route 12 in Tsalie	
BIA Route 68					
BIA Route 91					
BIA Route 125					
BIA Route 170	16		US Route 70 in Peridot	BIA Route 3 in San Carlos	Former SR 170
BIA Route 171			US Route 70 in Peridot	BIA Route 170 in Peridot	
BIA Route 221					
