= Calva =

Calva may refer to:

- Calva, Arizona, town on San Carlos Reservation
- Calva (sport), sport played in Spain
- Calva (river), river in Romania
- Calvaria (skull), a portion of the skull forming the roof of the cranial cavity

== See also ==
- Calvaria (disambiguation)
- Calvados (brandy), brandy from Normandy in France
