= List of tributaries of the Gila River =

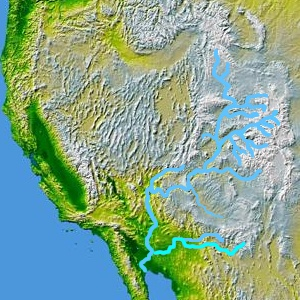
The Gila River, a tributary of the Colorado along the width of southern Arizona, is shown highlighted on a map of the southwestern United States. The Salt River (at Phoenix) is its tributary.

This is a List of tributaries of the Gila River, the final river drainage of the Colorado River, and covers the entire width of southern Arizona. The headwaters of the Gila River begin in the Gila National Forest of New Mexico. The northern branch tributary to the Gila River in the Gila National Forest, is the San Francisco River.

The map highlights the Gila River extending eastward across southern Arizona to the southwestern corner of Arizona and its input into the Colorado River, from its origins about 400 miles east in the southwestern corner of the state of New Mexico. The highlighted river north and adjacent is the Salt River which has the Verde River connected just prior to its drainage into the Gila River. The Verde and Salt rivers effectively drain the western and central portion of the Mogollon Rim, NW to SE across the state, and the White Mountain region of the Mogollon Rim, in east-central, and east Arizona.

The Verde River drainage into the Salt River, at its very northwestern drainages, east of Kingman, Arizona, even drains the South Rim, of the Grand Canyon. Thus, the Gila River watershed, may cover more than sixty (60) percent of the state.

== Three north–south drainages and Salt–Verde watershed ==
From west to east, the Hassayampa River's final destination is the dry desert, and groundwater. The second drainage, the Agua Fria River enters the Gila in western Phoenix, but not as a flowing river. The Agua Fria puts most of its winter drainage, or snowmelt/rain floodwaters into Lake Pleasant Regional Park. The largest of the three north/south rivers, the Verde River (plus the East Verde), goes through Horseshoe Reservoir and Bartlett Reservoir before joining the Salt River. (The Salt River enters the Gila, 40 miles downstream, through central Phoenix, and five miles before the Agua Fria River tributary. The Hassayampa River is 35 miles farther downstream, and just prior to the tributary of Centennial Wash.)

The Verde River drainage extends north and northwest of the Agua Fria River, and Hassayampa River drainages, and continues to the South Rim of the Grand Canyon. The combined Salt River–Verde River drainage would be the major (and central) component of the south Mogollon Rim drainages of central Arizona (the Mogollon Plateau also drains north to the Little Colorado River).

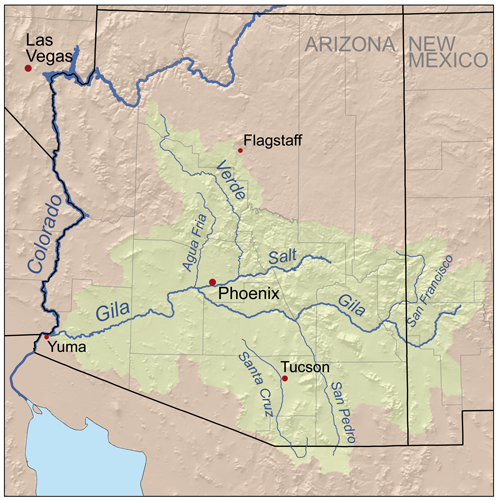
The Gila River drainage of Arizona. The Salt River (at Phoenix) and the Verde River co-join as one major northern tributary, part of the drainage for central and western Mogollon Rim.

== Gila watershed ==
- Agua Fria River – north
- Centennial Wash
- Eagle Creek
- Gila River
- Hassayampa River – north
- Queen Creek Wash
- Salt River
- San Carlos River, Arizona – (into San Carlos Lake)
- San Francisco River (Arizona and New Mexico)
- San Pedro River, Arizona – south
- San Simon River – southeast
- Santa Cruz River – south
- Verde River – north

== Arizona watersheds ==
NW Ariz (strip): Virgin River and Lake Mead
NE Ariz: (Colorado Plateau), Little Colorado River drainage, (Four Corners)
Central, E, S, and SE Ariz: Gila River drainage

SW Gila washes:
SW: one sixth of state as dry-wash or desert

W (+NW – Kingman), (into Colorado River): Bill Williams River (and Big Sandy River)

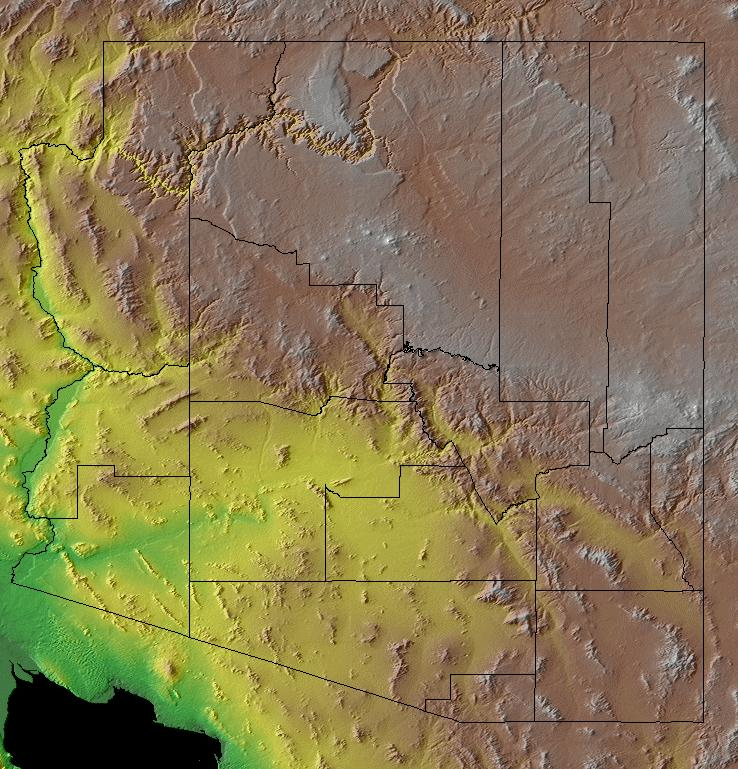
The Gila River, a tributary of the Colorado along the width of southern Arizona, and its valley can be traced on a map of Arizona. The Gila forms the boundary between various counties in Eastern Arizona.

== See also ==
- Gila River topics
- Tributaries of the Gila River topics
- List of tributaries of the Colorado River
- List of Arizona rivers
- List of New Mexico rivers
- List of Utah rivers
