= San Carlos River (United States) =

Tributary of the Gila River, Arizona

- Location within Arizona Location within the United States

Location
- Country: United States
- State: Arizona

Physical characteristics
- Source
  - coordinates: 33.4519982°N 110.1898172°W
- Mouth
  - coordinates: 33.1989481°N 110.4109296°W
- Length: 30 miles (48 km)

Basin features
- River system: Gila River

The San Carlos River is a 37-mile (60 km) long tributary of the Gila River in southeast Arizona, United States. The river drains an arid region of 1,026 square miles (2,660 km^{2}), situated mostly within the San Carlos Indian Reservation.

The river originates as the confluence of Ash Creek (30 miles (48 km) long) and Kidde Creek in the Natanes Mountains, a subrange of the Gila Mountains, at 4,300 feet (1,300 m) above sea level. Flowing west, it enters a deep canyon along the Gila–Graham County line. After receiving the Blue River from the right, the river is impounded in a small reservoir, Takalai Lake. Below the lake, the valley widens, and the river turns south, passing San Carlos and Peridot, before emptying into the northern arm of San Carlos Lake, a reservoir on the Gila River.

Most of the river's flow originates from springs in the canyons above Takalai Lake. The springs are considered sacred by the San Carlos Apache. The average annual discharge near Peridot is 54.2 cubic feet per second (1.53 m^{3}/s), with a maximum of 54,800 cubic feet per second (1,550 m^{3}/s) on January 8, 1993. Although the upper reaches of the river are perennial, the lower river is frequently dry during the early summer as a result of irrigation diversions.

== See also ==
- List of rivers of Arizona
- List of tributaries of the Colorado River
