= San Carlos, Arizona =

CDP in Gila County, Arizona

- Census-designated place
- Location in Gila County and the state of Arizona

- Location in the United States San Carlos (Arizona)
- Coordinates: 33°21′4″N 110°27′8″W
- Country: United States
- State: Arizona
- County: Gila

Area
  - Total: 8.58 sq mi (22.23 km^{2})
  - Land: 8.58 sq mi (22.21 km^{2})
  - Water: 0.0039 sq mi (0.01 km^{2})
- Elevation: 2,628 ft (801 m)

Population (2020)
  - Total: 3,987
  - Density: 464.9/sq mi (179.48/km^{2})
- Time zone: UTC-7 (MST (no DST))
- ZIP code: 85550
- Area code: 928
- FIPS code: 04-62910
- GNIS feature ID: 10812

San Carlos (Western Apache: Sengaa) is a census-designated place (CDP) in Gila County, Arizona, United States. The population was 4,038 at the 2010 census, up from 3,716 in 2000.

San Carlos is the largest community in and the seat of government for the San Carlos Apache Indian Reservation.

San Carlos' economy is underdeveloped and is based mainly on retail service industries, construction trades, and public administration.

== Geography ==
San Carlos is located in southeastern Gila County at 33°21′4″N 110°27′36″W (33.351069, -110.459862). Its eastern border is the San Carlos River, which is also the Graham County line. The San Carlos River flows south 8 miles (13 km) to San Carlos Lake, an impoundment on the Gila River.

According to the United States Census Bureau, the CDP has a total area of 8.6 square miles (22.2 km^{2}), of which 0.004 square miles (0.01 km^{2}), or 0.06%, is water.

San Carlos is located within the San Carlos Apache Indian Reservation.

== Demographics ==
Historical population
Census	Pop.	Note	%±
1970	2,542		—
1980	2,668		5.0%
1990	2,918		9.4%
2000	3,716		27.3%
2010	5,288		42.3%
2020	3,987		−24.6%

=== 2020 census ===
As of the 2020 census, San Carlos had a population of 3,987. The median age was 26.9 years. 37.0% of residents were under the age of 18 and 7.2% of residents were 65 years of age or older. For every 100 females there were 95.7 males, and for every 100 females age 18 and over there were 89.1 males age 18 and over.

0.0% of residents lived in urban areas, while 100.0% lived in rural areas.

There were 901 households in San Carlos, of which 56.8% had children under the age of 18 living in them. Of all households, 32.3% were married-couple households, 21.2% were households with a male householder and no spouse or partner present, and 36.6% were households with a female householder and no spouse or partner present. About 14.4% of all households were made up of individuals and 3.4% had someone living alone who was 65 years of age or older.

There were 951 housing units, of which 5.3% were vacant. The homeowner vacancy rate was 0.0% and the rental vacancy rate was 0.4%.

Racial composition as of the 2020 census
Race	Number	Percent
White	38	1.0%
Black or African American	0	0.0%
American Indian and Alaska Native	3,885	97.4%
Asian	0	0.0%
Native Hawaiian and Other Pacific Islander	4	0.1%
Some other race	21	0.5%
Two or more races	39	1.0%
Hispanic or Latino (of any race)	76	1.9%

=== 2000 census ===
As of the census of 2000, there were 3,716 people, 921 households, and 754 families living in the CDP. The population density was 420.9 inhabitants per square mile (162.5/km^{2}). There were 994 housing units at an average density of 112.6 per square mile (43.5/km^{2}). The racial makeup of the CDP was 92.6% Native American, 4.6% White, 0.2% Black or African American, 0.3% Asian, 0.2% from other races, and 2.0% from two or more races. 2.6% of the population were Hispanic or Latino of any race.

There were 921 households, out of which 49.1% had children under the age of 18 living with them, 46.1% were married couples living together, 29.4% had a female householder with no husband present, and 18.1% were non-families. 14.4% of all households were made up of individuals, and 2.7% had someone living alone who was 65 years of age or older. The average household size was 4.0 and the average family size was 4.4.

In the CDP, the population was spread out, with 42.1% under the age of 18, 8.7% from 18 to 24, 28.0% from 25 to 44, 15.8% from 45 to 64, and 5.4% who were 65 years of age or older. The median age was 24 years. For every 100 females, there were 96.4 males. For every 100 females age 18 and over, there were 96.2 males.

The median income for a household in the CDP was $13,412, and the median income for a family was $14,219. Males had a median income of $16,216 versus $22,563 for females. The per capita income for the CDP was $4,615. About 57.5% of families and 58.8% of the population were below the poverty line, including 62.4% of those under age 18 and 56.5% of those age 65 or over.

== Transportation ==
San Carlos Apache Nnee Bich'o Nii Transit provides transportation on the reservation and to Safford and Globe.

== Education ==
San Carlos is served by the San Carlos Unified School District.
