= San Carlos High School (Arizona) =

High school in San Carlos, Gila County, Arizona

Coordinates: 33°17′54″N 110°28′26″W

Location
- Highway 70 Mile Post 270; San Carlos, Arizona 85550; United States

Information
- School type: Public high school
- School district: San Carlos Unified School District
- CEEB code: 030389
- Principal: Susan Poole
- Teaching staff: 42.50 (FTE)
- Grades: 9-12
- Enrollment: 419 (2023-2024)
- Student to teacher ratio: 9.86
- Colors: Red, white and black
- Mascot: Braves
- Website: www.scbraves.net/o/schs

San Carlos High School is a high school in San Carlos, Arizona. It is part of the San Carlos Unified School District, which also includes a primary and intermediate school known as Rice Elementary.
