= Earl Gardner (murderer) =

American serial killer

- Born: August 2, 1906; San Carlos Apache Indian Reservation, Arizona, U.S.
- Died: July 13, 1936 (aged 29); Coolidge Dam, Arizona, U.S.
- Status: Executed by hanging
- Convictions: First degree murder (2 counts); Second degree murder
- Penalty: Death by hanging

Details
- Victims: 3
- Span of crimes: 1925–1935
- Country: United States
- State: Arizona

Earl Gardner (August 2, 1906 – July 13, 1936) was a Native American serial killer who killed three people, including his wife and infant son, on the San Carlos Apache Indian Reservation in Arizona between 1925 and 1935. Gardner served time in prison for killing a man in a fight in 1925. After his release, Gardner, who had a history of abusing his wife, murdered her and their son with an axe in 1935. He was sentenced to death for these murders and hanged in 1936.

Gardner's execution was botched, resulting in it taking over 30 minutes for him to die. Months later, Congress passed a law stating that all federal executions would now be carried out using whatever method was used in the state. This made Gardner the last person to be executed by hanging in Arizona.

== Early life, imprisonment, and parole ==
Gardner was short and was bullied for his size, causing him to develop a fierce temper. This led to him being despised by many of his colleagues as a "mad dog." He frequently and soon became an outcast. In 1925, Gardner stabbed Francis Knight to death during a fight following a drinking party. He later said that he had committed the crime in a "drunken frenzy." The crime was tried in federal court since it had occurred on a Native reservation, this putting it under federal jurisdiction. Gardner was convicted of second degree murder and sentenced to 13 years in prison. He was initially sent to the Federal Correctional Institution in Anthony, Texas, before being transferred to the United States Penitentiary near Fort Leavenworth, Kansas. He was released on parole in 1932.

After returning to the reservation, Gardner married a young girl named Nancy, whom he continuously physically abused during their marriage. They later had a son named Edward, who was just 27 days old when he was murdered.

== Subsequent murders and execution ==
On December 8, 1935, Gardner murdered his wife and infant son with an axe. He immediately turned himself into the police, telling his arresting officer, Salvador Grant, that he'd killed his family since his wife had wanted for him to stay home and take care of their child while she went to church.

I wasn't drunk this time. I was just crazy. My wife wanted me to take care of the baby again while she went off to church.

Gardner was charged with two counts of first degree murder. He tried to plead guilty in December 1935, insisting that the government should "take a good rope and get it over with," and that it was better to "die like an Apache" than die in prison.

I picked up a hatchet, and I struck her on the right side, then on the left side. The baby was in my arms. I walk out of tent, put baby down, and struck once. I never look at baby. I walk back in the tent and strike Alice in the head once more. Still got hatchet. Walk out. Threw it on the ground. I don't care whether you hang me or not.

However, the case proceeded to trial after Judge Albert Sames rejected his guilty plea. The trial started on January 20, 1936. The next day, Gardner took the stand, confessed, and asked for a death sentence. Ten jurors for a guilty verdict without a recommendation for mercy, while the other two jurors voted for a guilty verdict with a recommendation for mercy. The judge ordered a new hearing. On February 6, 1936, after 30 minutes of deliberations, Gardner was found guilty and sentenced to death. Judge Sames sentenced Gardner to death a week later. Asked if he had anything to say, Gardner replied, "I want you to get a good strong rope and have this happen immediately." Against his wishes, his attorney unsuccessfully appealed against his death sentence. Under federal law at the time, the execution had to be carried by hanging on federal territory, albeit Arizona had recently switched to the gas chamber as a method of execution. Federal authorities constructed a makeshift gallows near the Coolidge Dam, which was within the San Carlos Reservation, using an abandoned rock crusher left over from the dam's construction. Following rumors of a possible Native American uprising in the area, a force of men was deputized and armed to guard the gallows.

Gardner was held at the Gila County Jail with a fellow death row inmate, Ambrose Yesterday, while awaiting execution. Yesterday was never executed. On appeal, his sentence would be reduced to 40 years for second degree murder on appeal. Gardner's last meal consisted of ribeye steak, fried potatoes, and watermelon. He spent his last night inside a car near the gallows, having been taken from the Gila County Jail the night before. He arrived at the gallows at 5:00 AM. Asked if he wanted to make a final statement, Gardner said, "I guess I was nervous. Maybe scared. It won't do me any good to be scared now. It's over, I'm glad it's over. That's all.

The trapdoor was sprung at 5:06 AM, but the rope had slipped to the front of Gardner's neck, resulting in his hitting the side on his way down. His neck snapped back but did not break, so he laid gasping for air for a reported 33 minutes. Eventually, the sheriff stepped down through the trapdoor and pushed Gardner down with his foot to cut off his breathing. Following this, Gardner was pronounced dead at 5:33 AM. A black hearse arrived soon afterward to remove the body. After news of the botched execution reached Washington, Congress passed a law stating that all federal executions would then be carried out using whatever method was used in the state.

== See also ==
- List of people executed by the United States federal government
- List of serial killers in the United States
- List of botched executions
