= Calva (sport) =

Traditional Spanish sport

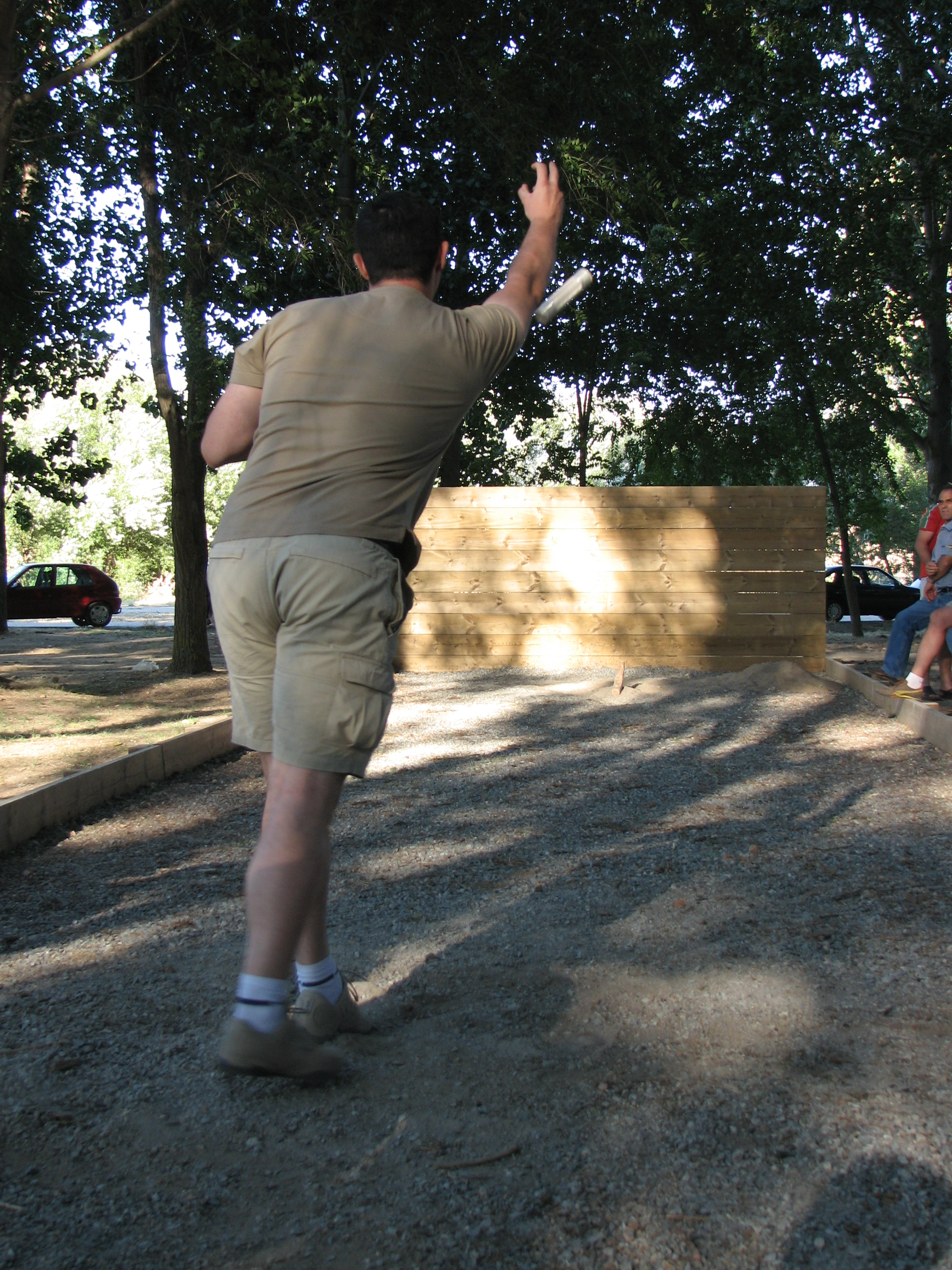
A calva player throws his marro at the calva, in which is located in front of the wooden wall.

Calva is a traditional sport played in certain parts of Spain. It has roots going back to pre-Roman times, being developed by the Celtiberians who lived in the modern-day provinces of Ávila, Salamanca, and Zamora. It was a game for shepherds, who threw stones at bull's horns to entertain themselves. With the passing of time, the game was modified: a piece of wood (the calva) came to be substituted for the horn, and the stone was replaced with a cylinder of iron or steel (the marro). The name of calva was derived from the field in which the game came to be played, which was free of obstacles and rocks.

Today the sport is practiced mainly in Castile, Salamanca, Zamora, and Biscay, although also in Madrid, Barcelona, Plasencia and Navarre.

== The game ==
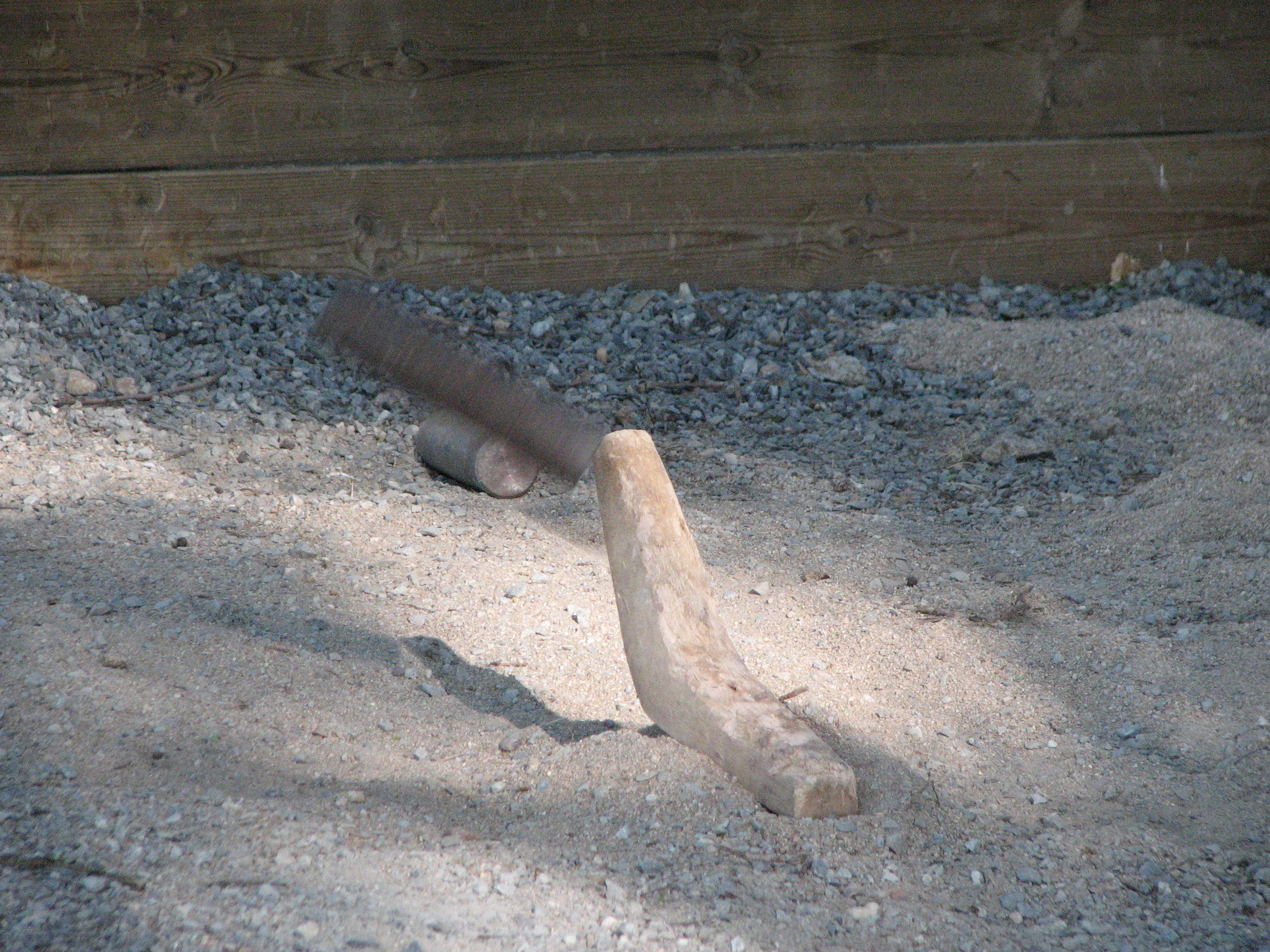
Close up of calva

The object is to knock down a piece of wood which is supported on one of its sides. The player, from 14.5 metres, must hit this calva with his marro, a metal cylinder. The player has 25 throws to achieve this, with two practice throws.

The calva is generally made of oak and has the form of an obtuse angle, between 110 and 120 degrees. The lower part, called the zapata, has a length of 23 cm, while the upper part (the alzada) is 22 cm long.

The marro was originally often a rock taken from a creekbed, where it had been worn smooth. Today it is usually an iron cylinder or oval with the name of its owner, weight, length, etc. often inscribed on it. It cannot be greater than 25 cm in length and generally weighs between 2 and 3 kilograms.

The field of play is usually about 25 metres in length and about 5 metres in width. The distance of the throw is standardized at 14.5 metres, leaving about 3-5 metres for an approach area and 6-8 metres to stop the throw.
