= Cutter, Arizona =

CDP in Gila County, Arizona

- Census-designated place
- Location of Cutter in Gila County, Arizona.

- Location within Arizona Location within the United States
- Coordinates: 33°21′10″N 110°39′09″W
- Country: United States
- State: Arizona
- County: Gila

Area
  - Total: 0.83 sq mi (2.14 km^{2})
  - Land: 0.83 sq mi (2.14 km^{2})
  - Water: 0 sq mi (0.00 km^{2})
- Elevation: 3,163 ft (964 m)

Population (2020)
  - Total: 84
  - Density: 101.7/sq mi (39.28/km^{2})
- Time zone: UTC-7 (Mountain (MST))
- ZIP code: 85542
- Area code: 928
- GNIS feature ID: 28221

Cutter is a census-designated place in Gila County in the U.S. state of Arizona. Cutter is located just off US Route 70, east of the city of Globe. The population as of the 2010 U.S. census was 74.

== Geography ==
Cutter is located at 33.358380°N 110.659327°W.

According to the U.S. Census Bureau, the community has an area of 0.826 square miles (2.14 km^{2}), all land.

== Demographics ==
Historical population
Census	Pop.	Note	%±
2020	84		—
U.S. Decennial Census
