= Coolidge Dam =

Dam in Gila and Pinal Counties, Arizona

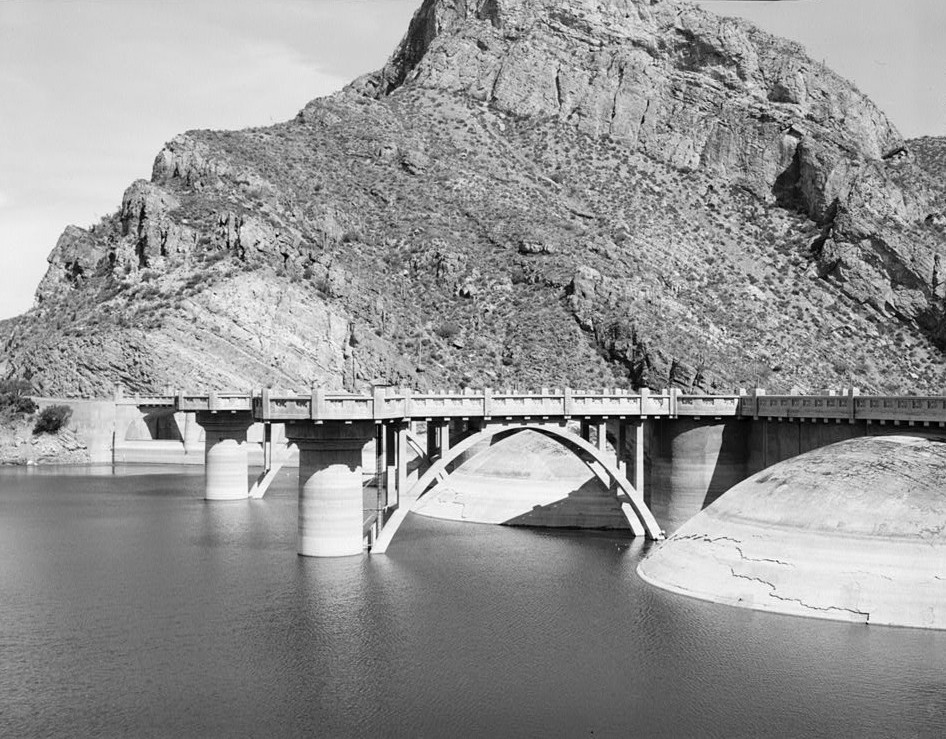
- Upstream face of Coolidge Dam, from Historic American Engineering Record
- Interactive map of Coolidge Dam
- Country: United States
- Location: Gila County and Pinal County, Arizona
- Coordinates: 33.174687°N 110.527863°W
- Status: Operational
- Construction began: 1924
- Opening date: 1930 (96 years ago)
- Construction cost: US$10 million ($149 million in 2024 dollars)
- Owner: Bureau of Indian Affairs

Dam and spillways
- Type of dam: Arch dam
- Impounds: Gila River
- Height: 249 ft (76 m)
- Elevation at crest: 2,535 ft (773 m)
- Width (crest): 580 ft (180 m)
- Dam volume: 200,000 cu yd (150,000 m^{3})
- Spillways: 2
- Spillway type: Ogee

Reservoir
- Creates: San Carlos Reservoir
- Total capacity: 910,000 acre⋅ft (1.12×10^{9} m^{3})

Power Station
- Commission date: 1935
- Decommission date: 1983
- Type: Conventional
- Turbines: 2 × 5 MW
- Installed capacity: 10 MW
- Coolidge Dam
- U.S. National Register of Historic Places
- Location within Arizona Location within the United States
- Area: 21 acres (8.5 ha)
- Built: 1927
- Built by: Major C.R. Olberg; Atkinson, Kier Bros. & Spice Co.
- Architect: Herman Neuffer
- Architectural style: Multiple Dome Dam
- NRHP reference No.: 81000135
- Added to NRHP: 29 October 1981

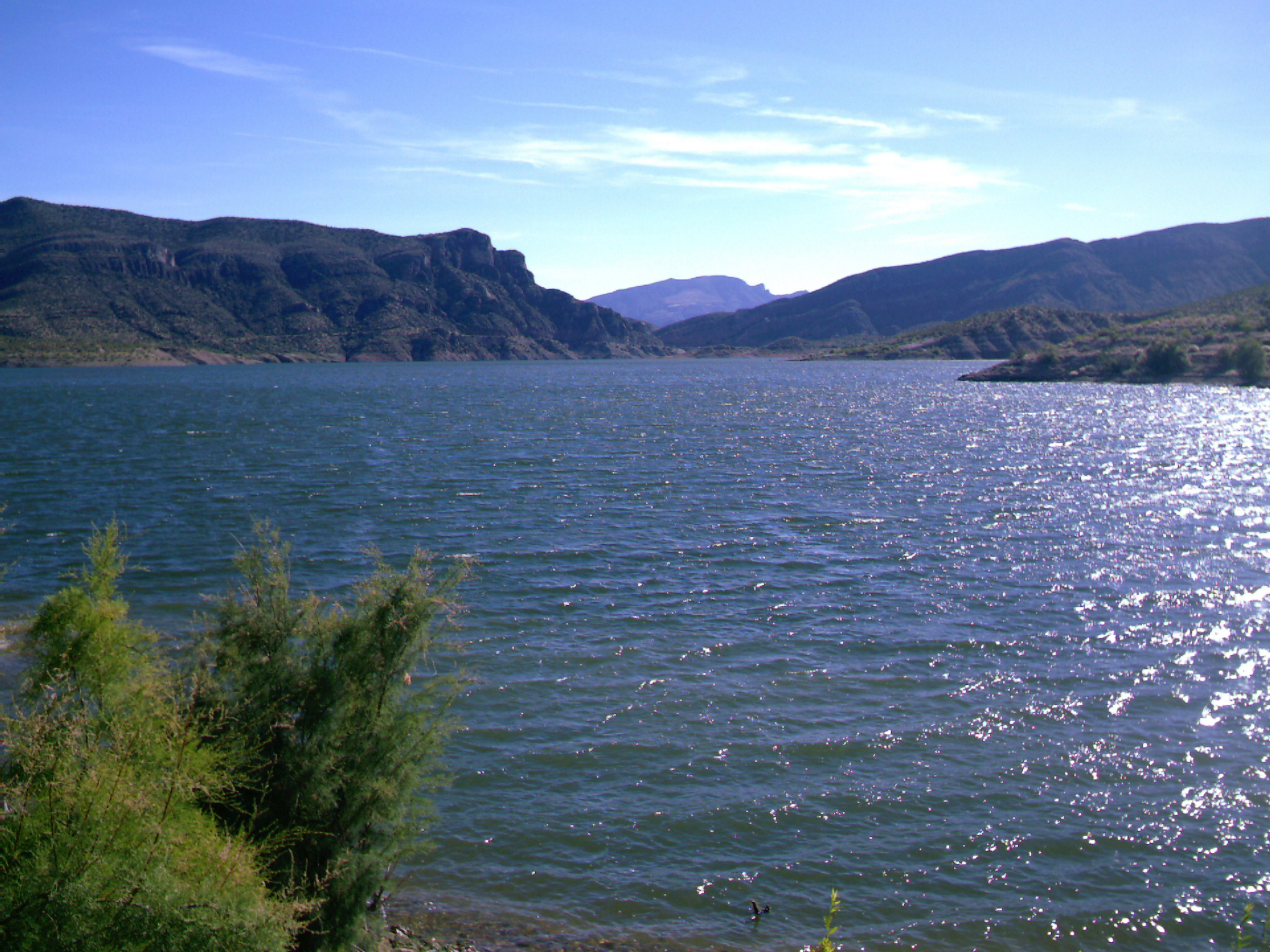
View of the lake, 2010

The Coolidge Dam is a reinforced concrete multiple dome and buttress dam 31 miles (50 km) southeast of Globe, Arizona on the Gila River. Built between 1924 and 1928, the Coolidge Dam was part of the San Carlos Irrigation Project. Coolidge Dam was named after the 30th US president, Calvin Coolidge and was dedicated by President Coolidge on 4 March 1930. The design and construction engineer was Herman Neuffer, who oversaw much of the construction undertaken by the Bureau of Indian Affairs (BIA) during the 1920s in Arizona and New Mexico.

Coolidge Dam impounds San Carlos Lake on the San Carlos Apache Indian Reservation. The project irrigates 100,000 acres (40,000 ha).

Since the water is impounded so it can be released when farmers need it, San Carlos Lake is often at a low level except in wet periods. When former President Coolidge dedicated the dam in 1930, the dam had not begun to fill. Humorist Will Rogers looked at the grass in the lake bed, and said, "If this were my lake, I'd mow it."

== History ==
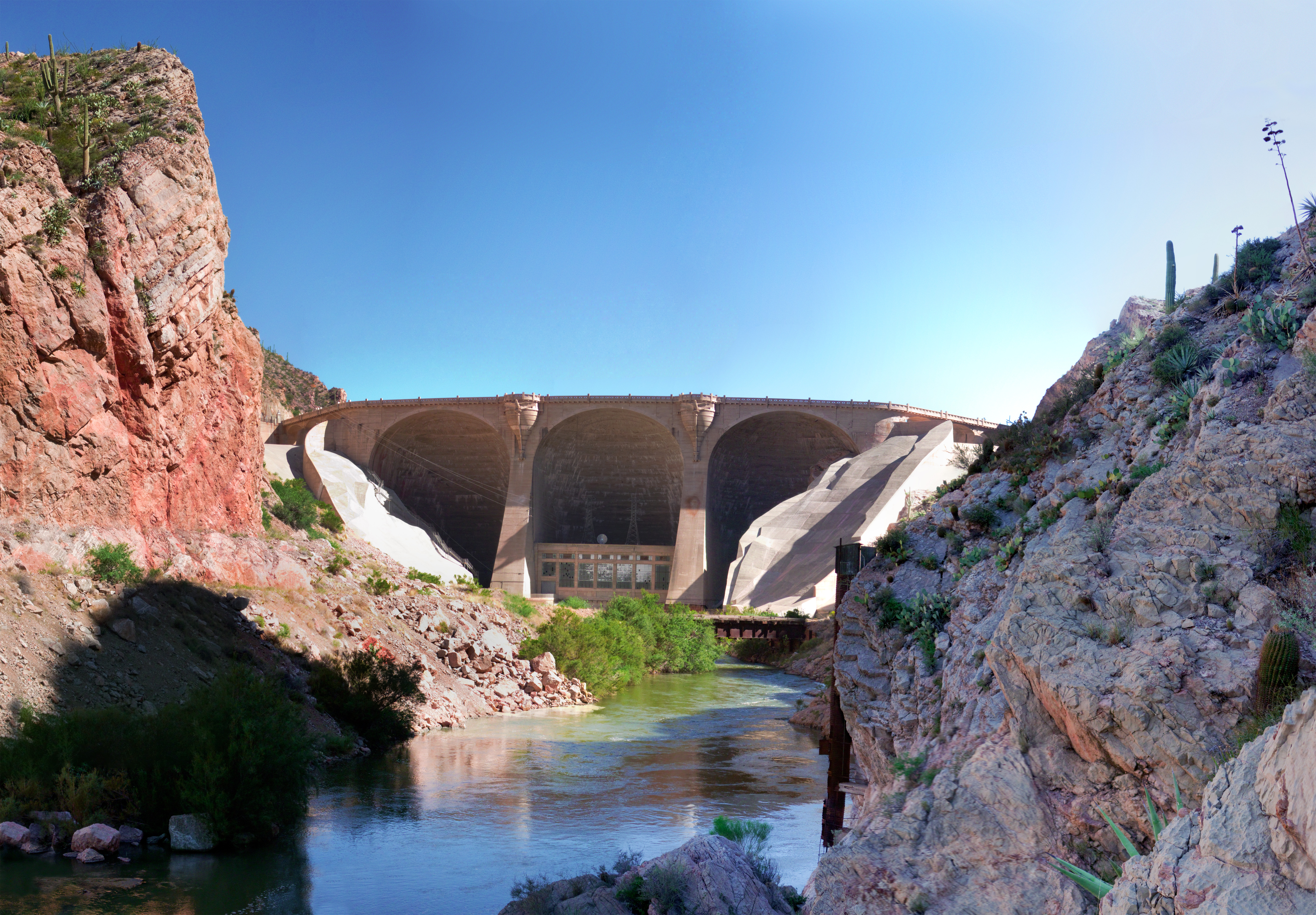
Coolidge Dam from downstream, showing its unique reinforced concrete multiple dome and buttress construction. 2009 photo

=== Construction ===
Coolidge Dam was constructed between 1924 and 1928 by the Bureau of Indian Affairs (BIA), which also owns and operates it, at a cost of US$10 million. The overall structure used 200,000 cubic yards (150,000 m^{3}) of concrete and consists of three domes, which are supported by buttresses on 100-foot (30 m) centers. It rises 249 feet (76 m), with a crest length of 580 feet (180 m). Two uncontrolled ogee crest spillways are concrete-lined and located on each abutment.

=== Opposition from Apache tribe ===
Construction of the dam incurred opposition from the Apache tribe, who feared a violation of their treaty rights, according to an author writing for the Federal Writers' Project:

A compromise was finally made with the Indians, and the tribal burial grounds and the old camp from which Geronimo started his bloody raids now lie deep under the waters of the reservoir. It was proposed to disinter the bodies but the Apache vehemently objected to what they considered desecration of the dead, so a concrete slab was laid over the principal burial ground at a cost of $11,000.

=== Execution site ===
In 1936, the Coolidge Dam was used an execution site for serial killer Earl Gardner. At the time, federal law mandated that all federal executions had to be carried out by hanging on federal territory. Federal authorities constructed a makeshift gallows using an abandoned rock crusher left over from the dam's construction. Gardner's execution was botched and took over half an hour for him to die. In response, Congress passed a law stating that all federal executions would now be carried out using whatever method was used in the state.

=== Hydroelectric power generation ===
As part of the San Carlos Indian Irrigation Project (SCIIP), Coolidge Dam formerly generated electricity from a hydroelectric plant. A diesel electric generating plant also run by the Project was built simultaneously and located on withdrawn land near the town of Coolidge. The latter facility provided power for irrigation wells, local towns, rural users, and mining operations. The diesel generators no longer function, therefore electricity is delivered to SCIP by the Western Area Power Administration. However, flood damage in 1983 rendered the hydroelectric station inoperable and restoration plans have been deemed infeasible. The electric plant at the dam was completed and began generating electricity in 1935, and the diesel plant was completed in December of that year and produced electricity the following year.

=== Structural modifications ===
In 1988, the Bureau of Reclamation completed a study that concluded that the dam needed modifications to prevent a failure should a significant flood or an earthquake occur. Earlier floods that had resulted in water topping the dam had eroded the abutments, and the buttresses were judged to be unstable. Work started in 1991 and included an access road to the downstream side of the dam. The work concluded in 1995. The final cost was estimated at $US46.5 million. ($87.2 million in 2024 dollars)

=== Flood of 1993 ===
In January 1993, heavy rainfall (up to three times the normal amount) in Arizona filled San Carlos Lake, and the operators were forced to release excess water. The ground was saturated, and the continuing rainfall ran off into the streams and rivers. In addition, the weather pattern for the year caused higher than normal temperatures in areas that would typically remain under snow. These areas received rain instead of snow, and the rivers began to run earlier and with far more volume than normal. Rivers in the southern part of Arizona at that time contained anywhere from three to nearly six times their normal amount of water. To complicate matters, the snowpack was already 150% the normal amount. Dam operators for Coolidge Dam released water in record levels because storage capacity had been reached.

As a result of the heavy water releases, several El Paso Natural Gas pipelines, which crossed the Gila River near Coolidge, Winkelman, and Kelvin were "scoured" or uncovered by the force of the water and failed. The water flow was concentrated through the release gates, as opposed to letting the water overtop the dam, which would have created a different scour rate. The force of the Gila River undermined and ultimately caused the failure of the north and south abutments of the bridge crossing at Attaway Road, upstream from Coolidge.

The flow into San Carlos Lake (from the Gila and San Carlos rivers) during January 1993 peaked between 3,000 to 3,500 cubic metres per second (110,000 to 120,000 cu ft/s). The flow from Coolidge Dam reached 927 cubic metres per second (32,700 cu ft/s), about seven times the expected maximum release rate of 133 cubic metres per second (4,700 cu ft/s), and was the highest release rate for the dam since its construction. Discharge at Winkleman was recorded at 1,050 cubic metres per second (37,000 cu ft/s) on 20 January 1993. Winkleman Flats, a small area near Winkleman, was flooded as well. However, despite earlier concerns about the dam's safety, it survived the flood even though retrofit work was in process at the time.

== Recreational use ==
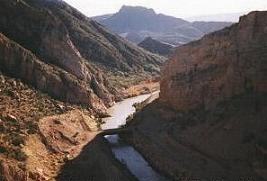
Gila River downstream from Coolidge Dam

=== Fishing and boating ===
San Carlos Lake is stocked periodically, and when the winter has experienced average or above average precipitation, is one of the largest lakes in Arizona. The San Carlos Apache Tribe Recreation & Wildlife Dept. stocks several species of fish using various methods to create a good fishing environment. Several species are self-sustaining:

- sunfish (Lepomis sp.)
- largemouth bass (Micropterus salmoides)
- black crappie (Pomoxis nigromaculatus)
- channel catfish (Ictalurus punctatus)
- flathead catfish (Pylodictis olivaris)

Other fish are stocked from cold-water fisheries including brown trout and rainbow trout. Jet-skiing, water skiing and boating are allowed. Individuals who are not members of the San Carlos Apache tribe who wish to use the lake must contact the tribal office for a permit since the lake is on tribal land.

=== Bicycle trail ===
Bicyclists can ride the access road to the dam face and back. The route is scenic and little-traveled, and rises a total of about 700 feet along the 13 mile route. The elevation at the dam is about the same as the starting point, so the trip is not strictly a climb, but peaks about the middle of the distance and then descends again to about 2,600 ft.

When they reach the dam, cyclists can either return to the starting point along the two-lane paved road, or they can continue eastward along the rougher part of the road until it rejoins U.S. Route 70. Before traveling on the reservation, non-tribe members must obtain a permit. A mountain bike or other rugged type bicycle is recommended for cyclists traveling east from the dam to Rte 70.
