= Calva, Arizona =

Populated place in Graham County, Arizona

- Populated place
- Location within Arizona Location within the United States
- Coordinates: 33°10′50″N 110°11′11″W
- Country: United States
- State: Arizona
- County: Graham
- Elevation: 2,559 ft (780 m)
- Time zone: UTC-7 (Mountain (MST))
  - Summer (DST): UTC-7 (MST)
- ZIP codes: 85530
- Area code: 928
- FIPS code: 04-09200
- GNIS feature ID: 2383

Calva is a populated place situated in Graham County, Arizona, United States.

== History ==
Calva's population was 50 in 1940.
