= Gila River =

River in New Mexico and Arizona, United States

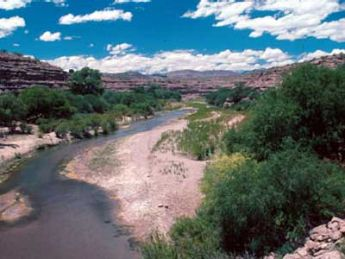
- The river in the Gila Box Canyon in eastern Arizona

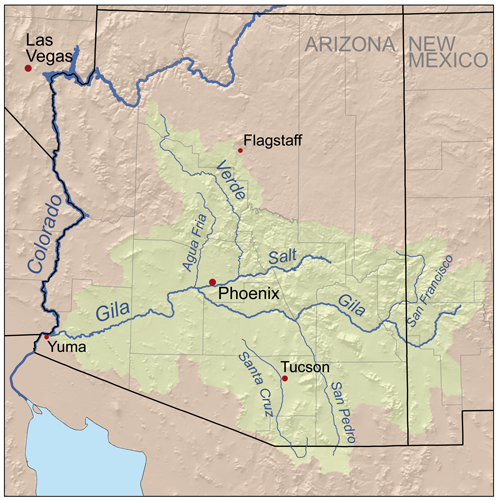
- Map of the Gila River watershed

Location
- Country: United States
- State: Arizona
- State: New Mexico

Physical characteristics
- Source: Confluence of East and West Forks
  - location: Grant County, New Mexico
  - coordinates: 33°10′47″N 108°12′22″W
  - elevation: 5,551 ft (1,692 m)
- Mouth: Colorado River
  - location: Yuma, Arizona
  - coordinates: 32°43′11″N 114°33′19″W
  - elevation: 118 ft (36 m)
- Length: 649 mi (1,044 km)
- Basin size: 58,200 sq mi (151,000 km^{2})
- Discharge
  - location: Dome, AZ; 12 mi (19 km) from the mouth
  - average: 247 cu ft/s (7.0 m^{3}/s)
  - minimum: 0 cu ft/s (0 m^{3}/s)
  - maximum: 200,000 cu ft/s (5,700 m^{3}/s)

Basin features
- Tributaries
  - left: San Simon River, San Pedro River, Santa Cruz River
  - right: San Francisco River, Salt River, Agua Fria River, Hassayampa River

The Gila River (/ˈhiːlə/ HEE-lə; O'odham: Keli Akimel or simply Akimel, Quechan: Haa Siʼil, Maricopa: Xiil) is a 649-mile-long (1,044 km) tributary of the Colorado River flowing through New Mexico and Arizona in the United States. The river drains an arid watershed of nearly 60,000 square miles (160,000 km^{2}) that lies mostly within the U.S., but also extends into northern Sonora, Mexico.

Indigenous peoples have lived along the river for at least 2,000 years, establishing complex agricultural societies before European exploration of the region began in the 16th century. European Americans did not permanently settle the Gila River watershed until the mid-19th century.

During the 20th century, development in the Gila River watershed prompted the construction of large diversion and flood control structures on the river and its tributaries, consequently the Gila contributes only a small fraction of its historic flow to the Colorado. The historic natural discharge of the river was around 1,900 cubic feet per second (54 m^{3}/s), but has declined to only 247 cubic feet per second (7.0 m^{3}/s). The engineering projects transformed much of the river valley and its surroundings from arid desert into irrigated land, and supply water to more than 6 million people in the Phoenix and Tucson metropolitan areas who live in the watershed.

== Geography ==
The Gila River has its source in western New Mexico, in Sierra County on the western slopes of the Continental Divide in the Black Range. It flows southwest through the Gila National Forest, the Gila Wilderness, and Gila Cliff Dwellings National Monument, then westward into Arizona, past the town of Safford. After flowing along the southern slope of the Gila Mountains in Graham County through a series of canyons, the Gila is impounded by Coolidge Dam in San Carlos Lake south of Peridot.

It emerges from the mountains into the valley southeast of Phoenix, Arizona, where it crosses the Gila River Indian Reservation as an intermittent stream due to large irrigation diversions, primarily at the Hayden Ashurst Diversion Dam. Well west of Phoenix, the river bends sharply southward along the Gila Bend Mountains, then swings westward again near the town of Gila Bend. It flows southwestward between the Gila Mountains to the south and the Languna and Muggins ranges to the north in Yuma County, and finally it empties into the Colorado at Yuma, Arizona.

The Gila is joined by many tributaries, beginning with the East and West Forks of the river, which combine to form the main stem near Gila Hot Springs in New Mexico. Above Safford, it is joined by the San Francisco River and the intermittent San Simon River. Further downstream, it is joined by the San Carlos River from the north in San Carlos Lake. At Winkelman, Arizona, it picks up the San Pedro River and then is joined by the Santa Cruz River south of Casa Grande. The Salt River, its main tributary, joins in the Phoenix metropolitan area, and further west the Gila receives its last two major tributaries, the Agua Fria and Hassayampa Rivers, from the north.

Although the Gila River flows entirely within the United States, the headwaters of two tributaries – the San Pedro and Santa Cruz Rivers – extend into Mexico. About 1,630 mi^{2} (4,200 km^{2}), or 2.8% of the Gila's 58,200-square-mile (151,000 km^{2}) watershed, is in Mexico. A further 3,300 mi^{2} (8,500 km^{2}) or 5.7% lies within New Mexico, while the remaining majority, 53,270 mi^{2} (138,000 km^{2}) or 91.5%, is in Arizona.

== History ==
A band of Akimel O'odham (Pima), the Keli Akimel O'odham (Gila River People), have lived on the banks of the Gila River since before the arrival of Spanish explorers. Popular theory says that the word "Gila" was derived from a Spanish contraction of Hah-quah-sa-eel, a Quechan word meaning "running water which is salty". Their traditional way of life (himdagĭ, sometimes rendered in English as Him-dak) was and is centered at the river, which is considered holy. Traditionally, sand from the banks of the river is used as an exfoliant when bathing (often in rainstorms, especially during the monsoon). Indigenous peoples such as the Hohokam were responsible for creating large, complex civilizations along the Middle Gila River and Salt River between 600 and 1450 AD. These native civilizations depended largely on irrigated agriculture, for which they constructed over 200 miles (300 km) of canals. The upper Gila was inhabited by the Mogollon culture over most of the same time period, in settlements like those at Gila Cliff Dwellings National Monument in the later period.

The first European to see the Gila River was possibly Spanish explorer and missionary Juan de la Asunción. Asunción reached the Gila in 1538 after traveling northwards along one of its tributaries, either the San Pedro or Santa Cruz. In 1540, Hernando de Alarcón sailed up the Colorado and Gila Rivers; maps drawn by his expedition show the river as the Miraflores or Brazos de la Miraflores.

During the Mexican–American War, General Stephen Watts Kearny marched 100 cavalrymen from the 1st U.S. Dragoons along the Gila River in November 1846. This detachment was guided by Kit Carson. The Mormon Battalion followed Kearny's troops, building a wagon trail roughly following the river from December 1846 to January 1847.

After the Treaty of Guadalupe-Hidalgo in 1848, the Gila River served as a part of the border between the United States and Mexico until the 1853 Gadsden Purchase extended American territory well south of the Gila. The confluence of the Gila with the Colorado River was also used as a reference point for the southern border of California. Beginning in 1871, mainly Mormon settlers populated the Gila River valley around modern Phoenix, using the Gila, Salt, and San Pedro Rivers for irrigation and establishing at least six major settlements.

In 1944, 25 German prisoners of war pulled off the largest and most spectacular escape from an American compound during the war, digging a 178-foot (54 m) tunnel out of the Navy's Papago Park Prisoner of War Camp in Arizona. All of the men were eventually captured, though some remained at large for more than a month. Among the last to be captured were three German soldiers who had based their audacious but ill-fated escape plans on a stolen highway map of Arizona, which showed the Gila River leading to the Colorado River, which in turn led to Mexico. Devising a scheme to flee by water, the Germans constructed a collapsible kayak under the noses of their American captors, tested it in a makeshift pool within the prison compound, then sneaked it out through the tunnel. Their plan was perfect – except for the map. The Gila, shown as a healthy blue waterway, turned out to be little more than a dry rut.

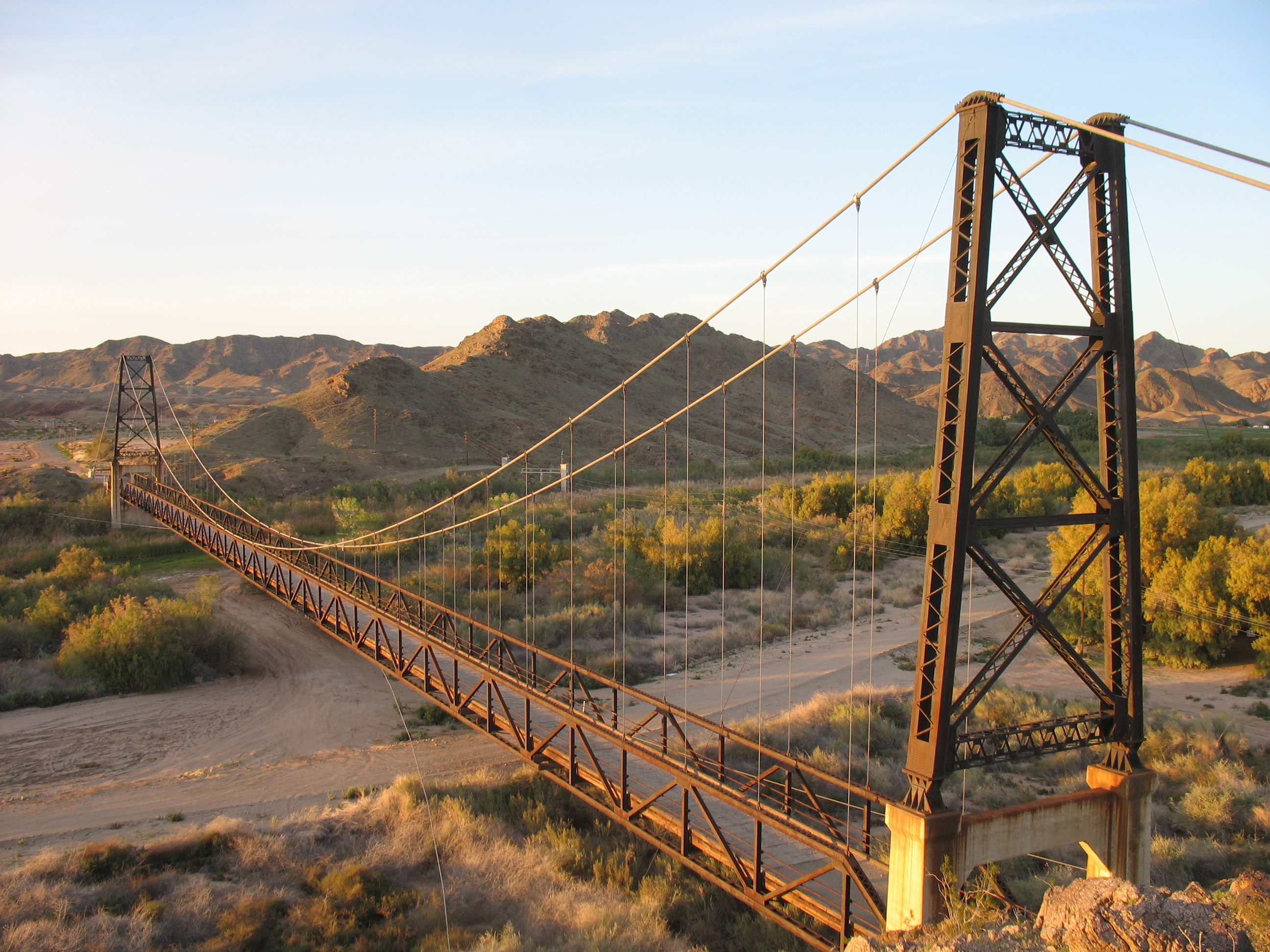
The McPhaul Suspension Bridge on a former section of US Route 95 spans the Gila between the Gila and Laguna ranges in Yuma County. The bridge is listed on the National Register of Historic Places. The flowing river is visible in the top left corner of the photo.

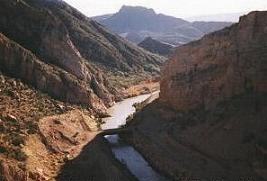
The Gila River near Coolidge Dam in Arizona

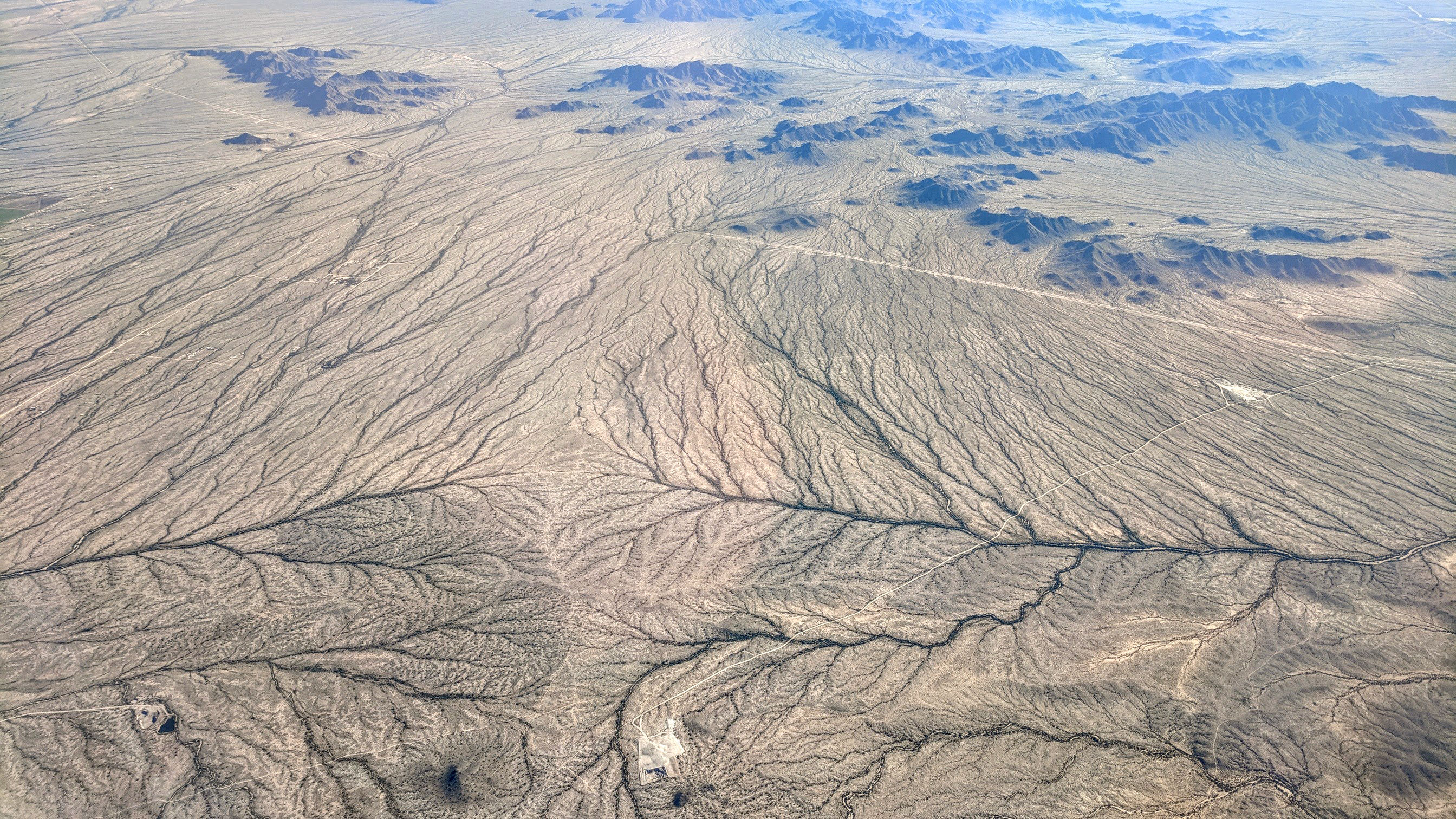
This patch of desert south of Buckeye, Arizona, drains east and west from a minor drainage divide. When they flow, both sides flow to the Gila River.

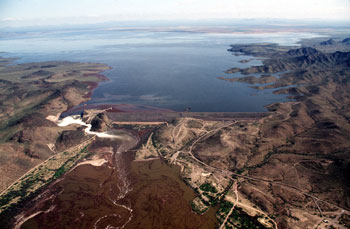
Painted Rock Dam in central Arizona, with its usually dry reservoir nearly full after heavy runoff in 2005

== Hydrology ==
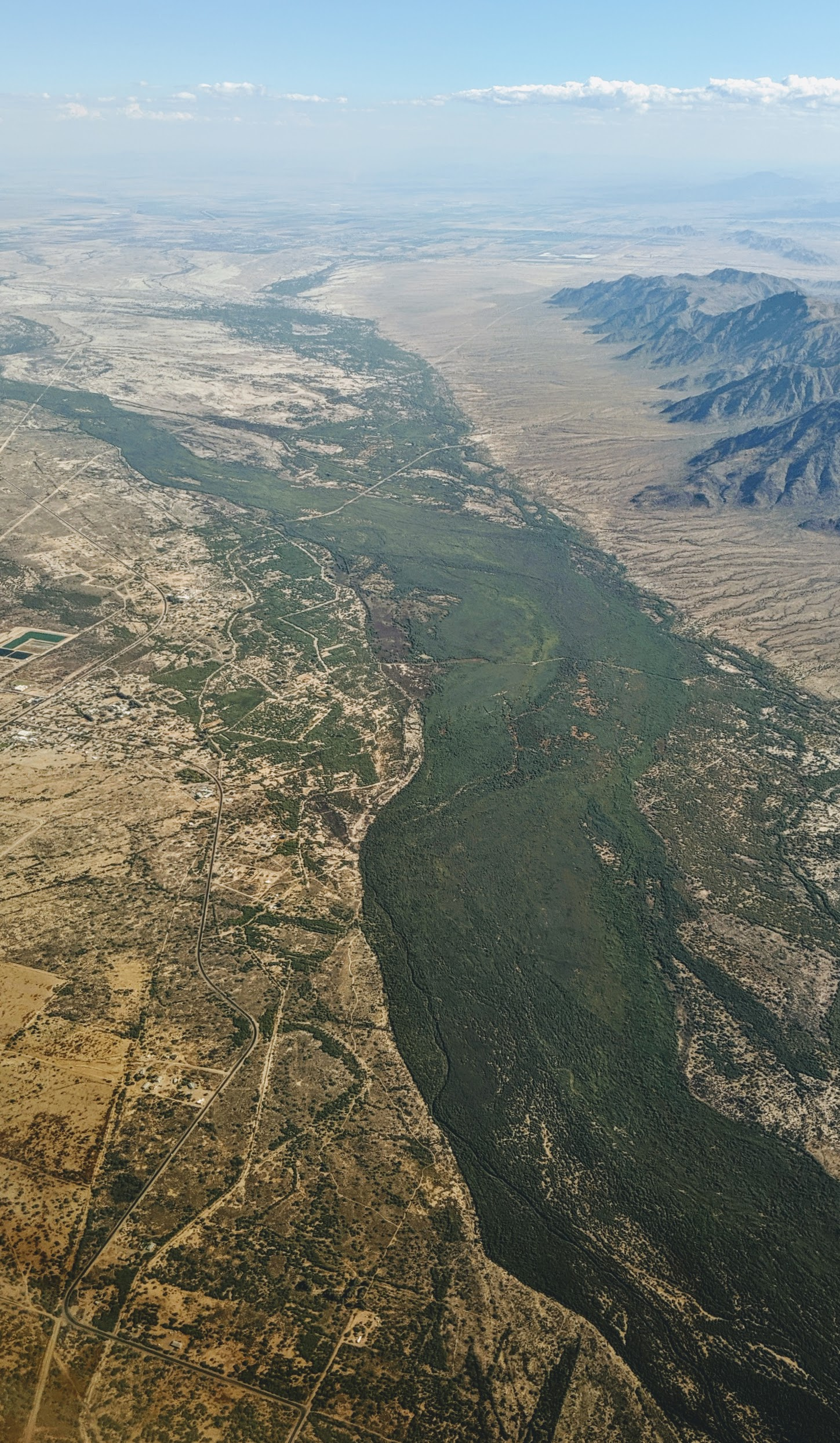
Gila River at Komatke, Arizona, in the Gila River Indian Community, just south of Phoenix

The only major dam on the Gila River is Coolidge Dam, 31 miles (50 km) southeast of Globe, Arizona, which forms San Carlos Lake. The Painted Rock Dam crosses the Gila near Gila Bend, although the river is intermittent at that point. The majority of the water is diverted at the Ashurst-Hayden Diversion Dam near Florence, Arizona. A number of minor diversion dams have been built on the river between the Painted Rock Dam and the Coolidge Dam, including the Gillespie Dam, which was breached during a flood in 1993.

Many dams have been built on tributaries to the Gila River, including Theodore Roosevelt Dam, Horse Mesa Dam, and Mormon Flat Dam on the Salt River, New Waddell Dam on the Agua Fria River, and Bartlett Dam on the Verde River.

Many major dams in the Gila River system were built and operated by the U.S. Bureau of Reclamation, which also constructed most of the large dams throughout the Colorado River basin. Others, such as Coolidge Dam, are owned by local water supply agencies, irrigation districts, or Native American tribes.

The Gila River and its main tributary, the Salt River, were both perennial streams carrying large volumes of water – the Gila was once navigable by large riverboats from its mouth to near Phoenix, and by smaller craft from Phoenix nearly to the Arizona-New Mexico border – until irrigation and municipal water diversions turned both into usually dry rivers which carry water only after local downpours create flooding. Below Phoenix to the Colorado River, the Gila is usually either a trickle or completely dry, as is also the lower Salt from Granite Reef Diversion Dam downstream to the Gila, but both rivers can carry large volumes of water following rainfall.

The historic width of the Gila River varied from 150 to 1,200 feet (46 to 366 m) with a depth of 2 to 40 feet (0.61 to 12.19 m). Its natural discharge was roughly 1,300,000 acre-feet (1.6 km^{3}) per year, with a mean flow of about 1,800 cubic feet per second (51 m^{3}/s) at the mouth. The river's modern discharge near the mouth is less than 180,000 acre-feet (0.22 km^{3}) per year, with an average flow of just 247 cubic feet per second (7.0 m^{3}/s). Overdraft from the Gila River system prompted the construction of the Central Arizona Project, which delivers some 1,500,000 acre-feet (1.9 km^{3}) annually from the Colorado River to supplement water supplies in the basin.

The upper Gila River, including its entire length within New Mexico, is a free-flowing one. Recent efforts to allow for damming or otherwise diverting this stretch have met with stiff political resistance, having been named as one of the nation's most endangered rivers due to proposed dam projects such as Hooker Dam. During his time in office, former New Mexico Governor Bill Richardson had promised to block any such attempt during his term, and he had even considered pushing for a statutory prohibition against any such projects on the state's portion of the river.

== Recreation ==
The Gila River between Virden, New Mexico, and Solomon, Arizona, is navigable during spring snowmelt and after summer and autumn storms. The river passes through many scenic canyons and stretches of Class I to III whitewater. Due to its desert surroundings, the river is characterized by erratic flows and flash floods that reach high peaks and drop off just as quickly. The Gila's Salt River tributary has even more difficult whitewater, ranging up to Class IV in places, and often has higher and more dependable flows than the Gila.

Boating and fishing are popular on San Carlos Lake and other basin reservoirs, including Lake Pleasant and Theodore Roosevelt Lake. The river system has 36 fish species, including largemouth bass, sunfish, channel catfish, flathead catfish, and Gila trout (Oncorhynchus gilae gilae).

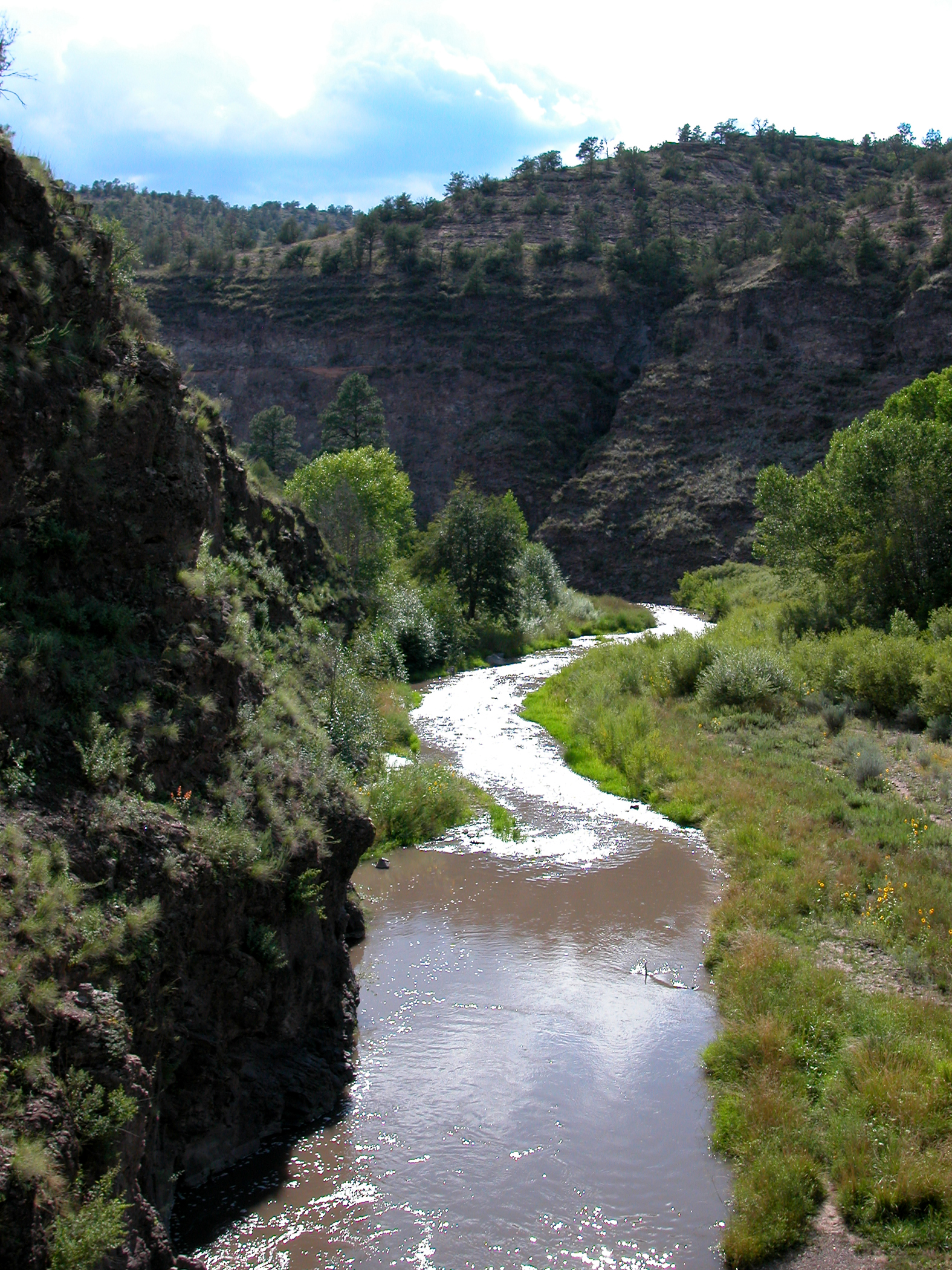
Middle Fork of the Gila River, SW New Mexico

Rock spires above the East Fork of the Gila River, Gila Wilderness

== Variant names ==
The Gila River has also been known as:

- Akee-mull
- Apache de Gila
- Brazo de Miraflores
- Cina`ahuwipi (Chemehuevi language)
- Hah-quah-sa eel (Yuma language)
- Hela River
- Jila River
- Rio Azul
- Rio Gila
- Rio de las Balsas
- Rio del Nombre Jesus
- Rio del los Apostoles
- Zila River
- Xila River
- Keli Akimel

== See also ==
- Gila and Salt River Meridian
- Gila River War Relocation Center
- List of Arizona rivers
- List of New Mexico rivers
- List of longest rivers of the United States (by main stem)
- List of tributaries of the Gila River
- Needle's Eye Wilderness
- San Francisco River
- San Pedro River
- Santa Cruz River
