= San Carlos Lake =

Waterbody in Arizona

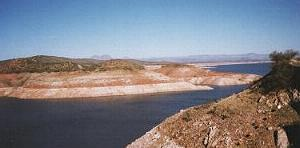

- Location within Arizona
- Location: Gila / Graham / Pinal counties, Arizona, United States
- Coordinates: 33°11′16″N 110°28′20″W
- Type: reservoir
- Primary inflows: Gila River
- Primary outflows: Gila River
- Basin countries: United States
- Managing agency: San Carlos Apache Tribe Recreation & Wildlife Dept.
- Max. length: 23 mi (37 km)
- Max. width: 2 mi (3.2 km)
- Surface area: 19,500 acres (7,900 ha)

San Carlos Lake was formed by the construction of the Coolidge Dam and is rimmed by 158 miles (254 km) of shoreline. The lake is located within the 3,000-square-mile (7,800 km^{2}) San Carlos Apache Indian Reservation, and is thus subject to tribal regulations.

After it was built, the reservoir filled gradually. Because of irrigation needs, the water level at the lake sometimes is low enough to kill its self-sustaining fish, but during wet years, the water can overtop Coolidge Dam. Since construction of the dam, the lake has been nearly empty at least 20 times, and has been full only three times.

When President Calvin Coolidge dedicated the new dam in 1930, Cherokee humorist Will Rogers looked at the grass in the lake bed, and said, "If this were my lake, I’d mow it."

== Recreational use ==
=== Fishing, boating and camping ===
San Carlos Lake is stocked periodically, and after winters with average or above average precipitation, is one of the largest lakes in Arizona. The San Carlos Apache Tribe Recreation and Wildlife Department stocks several species of fish using various methods to improve fishing. Several species are self-sustaining:

- Sunfish (Lepomis sp.)
- Largemouth bass (Micropterus salmoides)
- Black crappie (Pomoxis nigromaculatus)
- Channel catfish (Ictalurus punctatus)
- flathead catfish (Pylodictis olivaris)

The lake has set state records for largemouth bass, black crappie, and flathead catfish. Other fish are stocked from cold-water fisheries, including brown trout and rainbow trout.

Jet-skiing, water skiing, and boating are also allowed. Individuals who are not members of the San Carlos Apache tribe who wish to use the lake must contact the tribal office for a permit, since the lake is on tribal land.

Soda Canyon Point Campground is located on the north side of the lake. Since the lake level varies greatly during the summer, visitors are advised to call the San Carlos Apache Recreation and Wildlife Department to determine the current lake level.
